= Tatetsuki Site =

Second century burial mound in Kurashiki, Okayama, Japan

- 楯築遺跡 (Japanese)
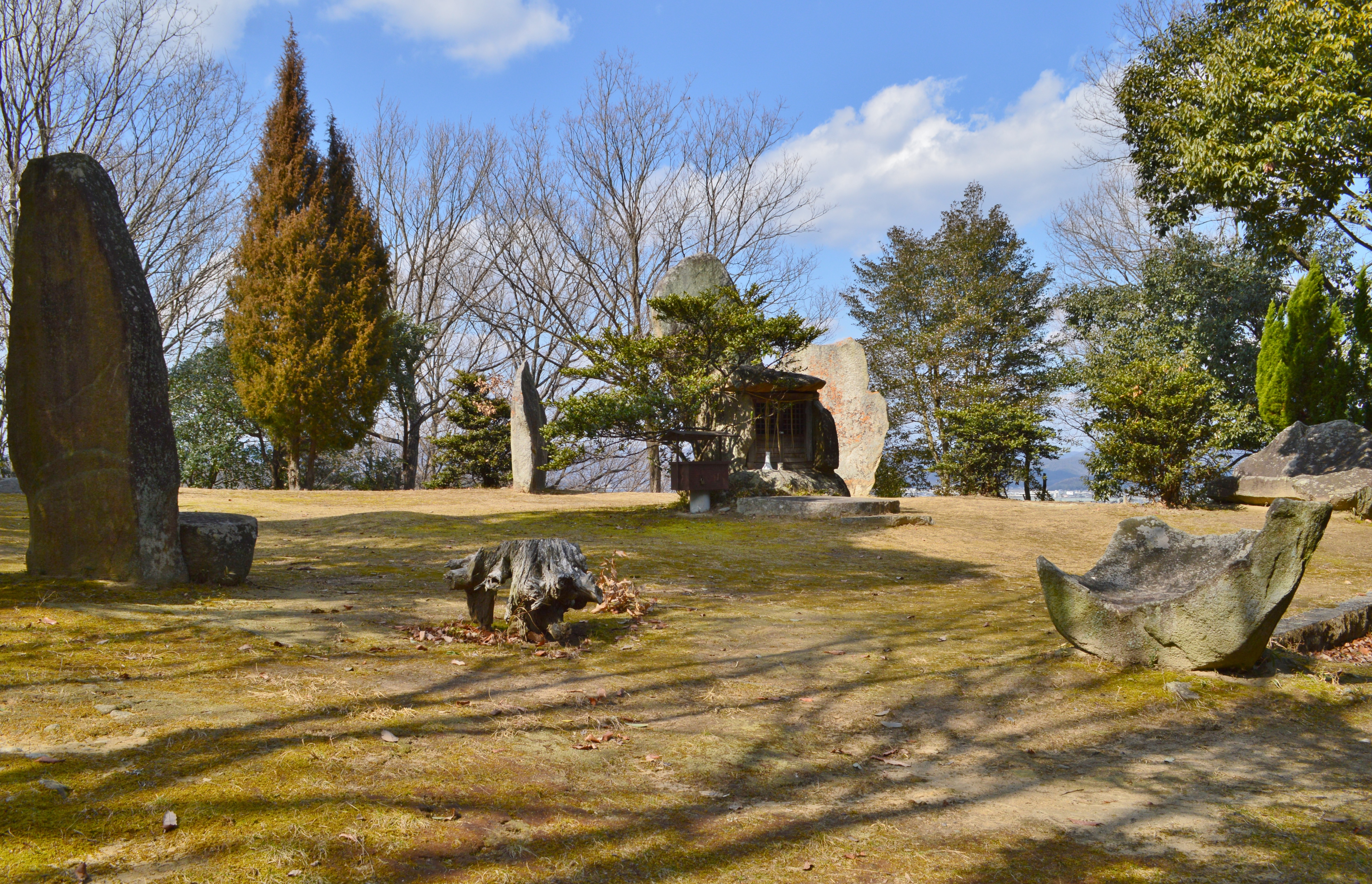
- Tatetsuki Site

- Tatetsuki Site Tatetsuki Site (Japan)
- Interactive map of Tatetsuki Site
- 34°39′47″N 133°49′31.75″E
- Type: Kofun
- Periods: Yayoi period
- Location: Kurashiki, Okayama, Japan
- Region: San'yō region

History
- Built: mid 2nd century

Site notes
- Public access: Yes (no facilities)

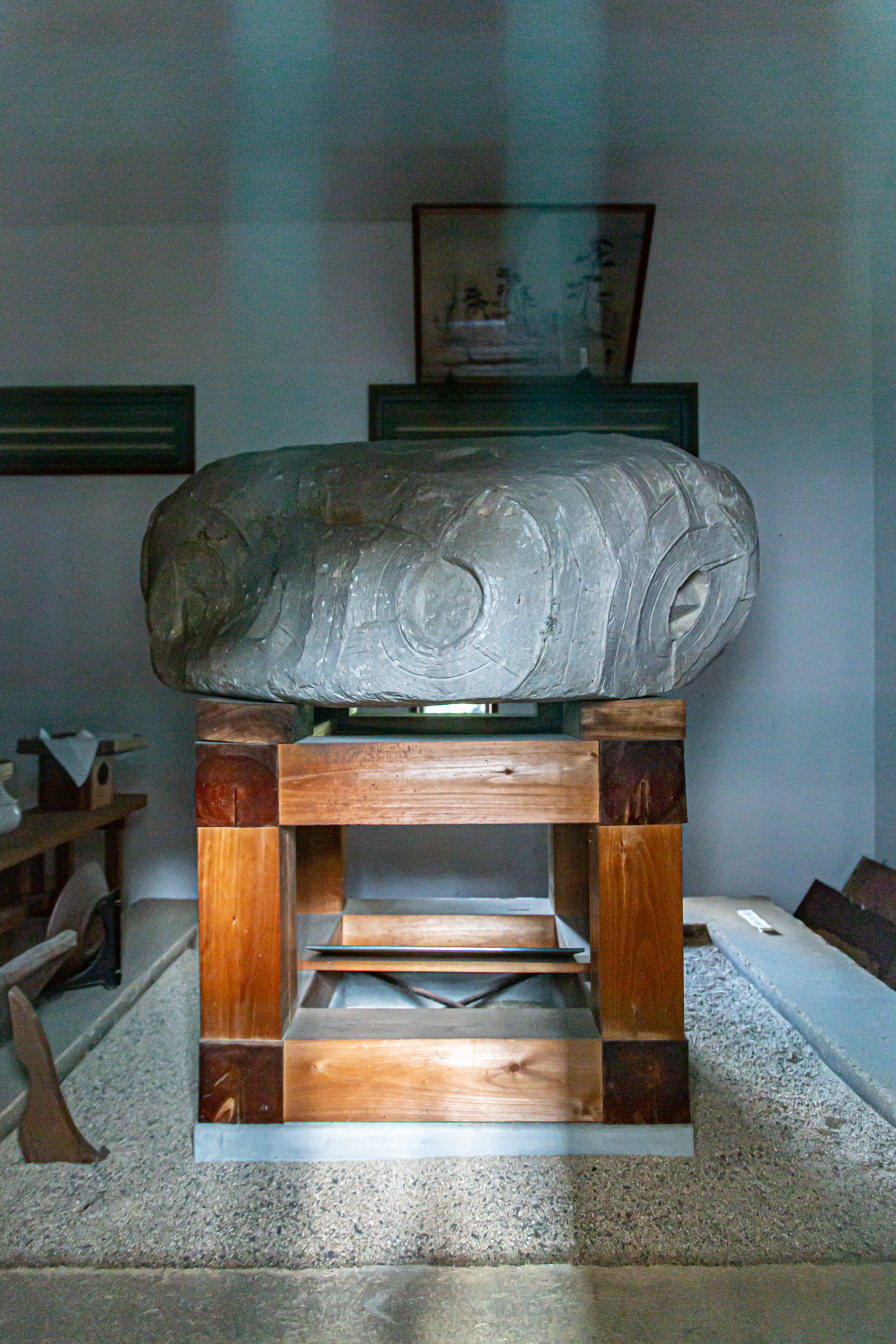
Sentaimonseki (旋帯文石)

Tatetsuki Site (楯築遺跡, Tatetsuki Iseki) is a Yayoi period burial mound, located in the Yabe neighborhood of the city of Kurashiki, Okayama Prefecture, in the San'yō region of Japan. The tumulus was designated a National Historic Site of Japan in 1981. It is one of the largest Yayoi period graves in Japan.

== Overview ==
The Tatetsuki tumulus is roughly 43 meters in diameter and four to five meters in height and has rectangular projections on the northeast and southwest sides. At the top of the tumulus, five megalithic stones surround the burial chamber, which contained a wooden coffin. On the slopes, there were about 20 stone rows with a height and width of more than one meter, on the exposed surface of the ground. However, the protruding part on the northeast side has been mostly destroyed due to the construction of the housing complex. Today, only a portion remains, extending for about ten meters. Its upper surface is about three to four meters wide. The front of the protrusion descends on a rather steep slope by about two to three meters and reaches a path running from east to west. Pebbles, similar to fukiishi, are placed in double and triple layers. The protruding part on the southwest side extends for about 20 meters and has a long, narrow ridge that is several meters wide and about two meters high. Both sides of the tip are rounded and a large row of stones is attached to the tip. A water tower now stands on the western part. It is possible that the tumulus was surrounded by a moat, which is now filled in.

Between 1976 and 1986, six archaeological excavations were conducted by the Archeology Laboratory of the Faculty of Letters, Okayama University. Two burial chambers were confirmed, and a wooden coffin was buried 1.5 meters underground in the center of the top of the mound. The excavated wooden coffin was about two meters long and 0.7 meters wide, and the bottom of the coffin was covered with 30 kilograms of vermilion. No bones were found, and only two tooth fragments were unearthed. The wooden coffin was housed in a wooden outer box with a total length of 3.5 meters and a total width of 1.5 meters. Grave goods were placed in the outer box and included one iron sword, two necklaces, many glass beads, and small tube beads. These artifacts are now housed in the Okayama University Archaeological Museum. In addition, another burial facility was discovered nine meters southeast of the central burial chamber, but only a small amount of vermillion was found and no grave goods were excavated. The paucity of burial goods is thought to be influenced by the burial customs of the period, rather than being related to authority or wealth.

In the protruding portion that was destroyed during the construction of the housing complex an array of vermilion-lacquered pot-shaped earthenware was discovered. Based on these pots and other pottery fragments found throughout the tumulus, it is believed that this site was a burial mound for chieftains of the Kingdom of Kibi during the late Yayoi period (late 2nd century to early 3rd century). After the end of the Civil War of Wa at the end of the 2nd century, large-scale burial mounds began to appear along the coast of the Seto Inland Sea, which includes this area. The fact that such large burial mounds were built before the Kofun period suggests that there was a large political power in this area that used special vessels and jars for funerary ceremonies. Later, in the middle of the Kofun period, Tsukuriyama Kofun, Sakuyama Kofun and other large keyhole-shaped burial mounds were constructed in the vicinity of this site.

On the top of the mound was stone carved with a pattern of swirling lines and discs, known as the Sentaimon-seki (旋帯文石). This pattern is of the same kind as found on special vessel stands used for ritual ceremonies in the Yayoi period. This stone has been passed down from generation to generation at Tatetsuki Shrine, which existed until the beginning of the Taisho period and is now housed in a storehouse near the ruins. This is called a "dense arc belt pattern stone", and similar arc-patterned discs have been found at the Makimuku ruins in Sakurai, Nara. The stone is designated a National Important Cultural Property

The Tatetsuki Tumulus is located in the Ohaka-no-oka Historic Site Park which includes the Ohakayama Kofun and the Hibata Temple Ruins. It is located about 30 minutes on foot from Kibitsu Station on the JR West Kibi Line.

== See also ==
- List of Historic Sites of Japan (Okayama)
