= Tamura Shrine =

Shinto shrine in Takamatsu, Kagawa Prefecture Japan

Tamura Jinja 田村神社
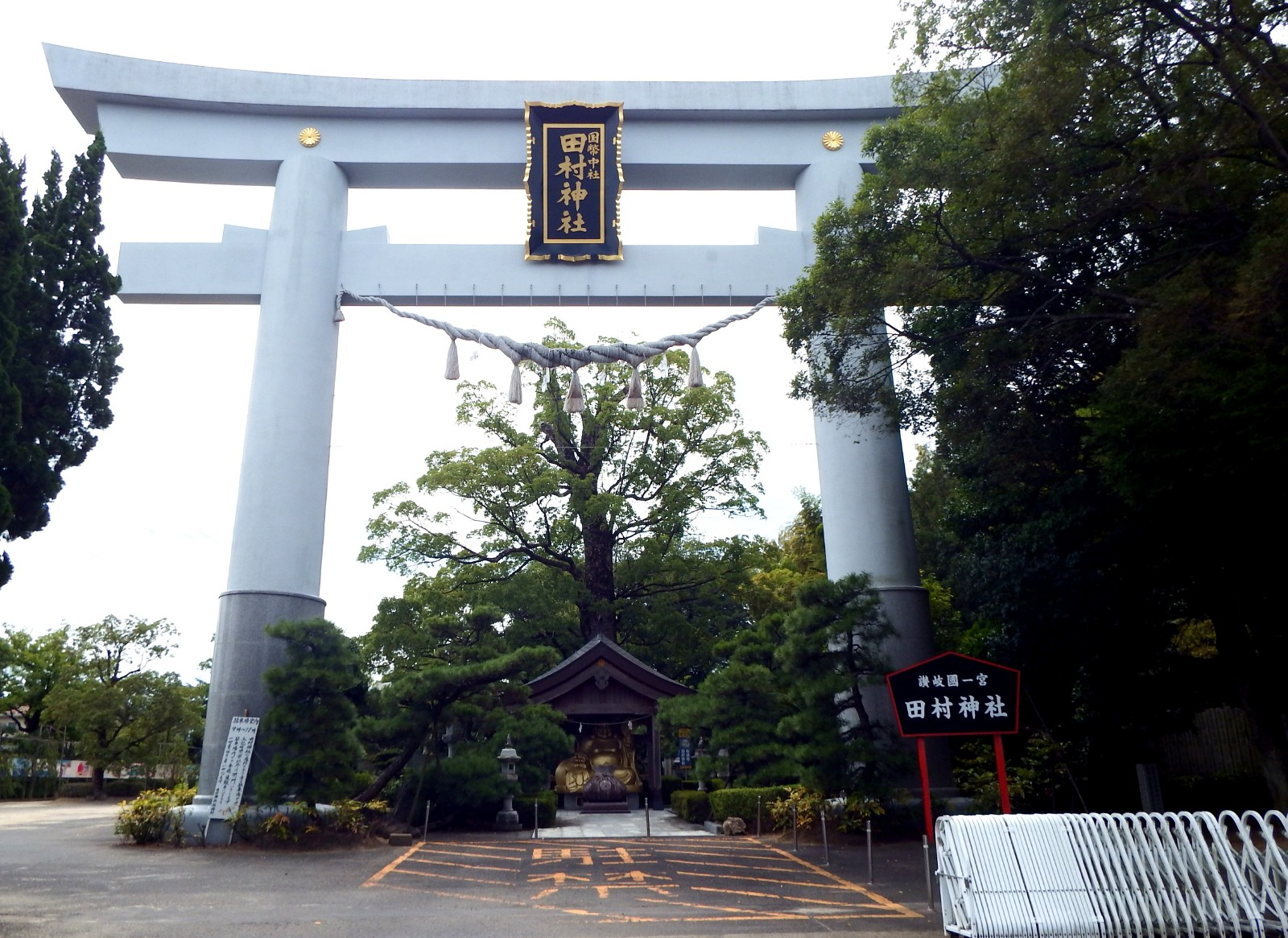
- Main Torii of Tamura Jinja

- Location within Kagawa Prefecture Location within Japan

Religion
- Affiliation: Shinto
- Festivals: May 8 and October 8

Location
- Location: 286 Ichinomiyacho, Takamatsu-shi, Kagawa-ken 761-8084
- Interactive map of Tamura Jinja 田村神社
- Coordinates: 34°17′11.53″N 134°1′38.25″E

Architecture
- Established: unknown

Website
- Official website

Tamura Jinja (田村神社) is a Shinto shrine in the Ichinomiya neighborhood of the city of Takamatsu in Kagawa Prefecture, Japan. It is the ichinomiya of former Sanuki Province. The main festivals of the shrine are held annually on May 8 and October 8. It is located approximately 7 km south of downtown Takamatsu. The area has abundant spring water, and the shrine is based on the worship of the god of water and the shrine's inner shrine is built over a spring. The name 'Tamura' is based on locale, and has no relationship with Sakanoue no Tamuramaro like other shrines of the same name in other parts of Japan.

== Enshrined kami ==
The kami enshrined at Tamura Jinja are:

- Yamato totohi momoso hime-no-Mikoto (倭迹迹日百襲姫命), the daughter of the 7th Emperor Kōrei, and a miko known for her divine marriage with Omononushi (the god of Mount Miwa)
- Kibitsuhiko-no-mikoto (五十狭芹彦命), the son of Emperor Kōrei and conqueror of the Kingdom of Kibi.
- Sarutahiko Ōkami (猿田彦大神), leader of the earthly kami.
- Ame no Kaguyama no Mikoto (天隠山命)
- Ame no Ita no Mikoto (天五田根命)

== History ==
The origins of Tamura Jinja are unknown. The monk Gyoki built a shrine over a sacred well in 709 AD; however, it is also recorded that a Buddhist temple was built at this site in that Taihō era (701-704). The temple and shrine were patronized by the Imperial family from an early date. The shrine is mentioned in the "Nihon Sandai Jitsuroku" and Engishiki records from the early Heian period, and was regarded as the ichinomiya of the province from this time. It was promoted to Shoichii (Senior First Rank) in 1201, and a tablet with the inscription 'Shoichii Tamura Daimyojin' dated July 1284 survives at the shrine. The shrine was extended and reconstructed by Hosokawa Katsumoto in 1460. It was destroyed in the wars of the Tenshō era (1573-1592), but reconstructed again under the patronage of the Matsudaira clan, the daimyo of Takamatsu Domain under the Tokugawa shogunate. In 1679, Ichinomiya-ji was separated from the Tamura Jinja, and the shrine lost its position as a stop on the Shikoku pilgrimage.

During the Meiji period era of State Shinto, the shrine was rated as an Imperial shrine, 2nd rank (国幣中社, kokuhei-chūsha) under the Modern system of ranked Shinto Shrines

The shrine is located a 10-minute walk from Ichinomiya Station on the Takamatsu-Kotohira Electric Railroad Kotoden Kotohira Line.

== Gallery ==
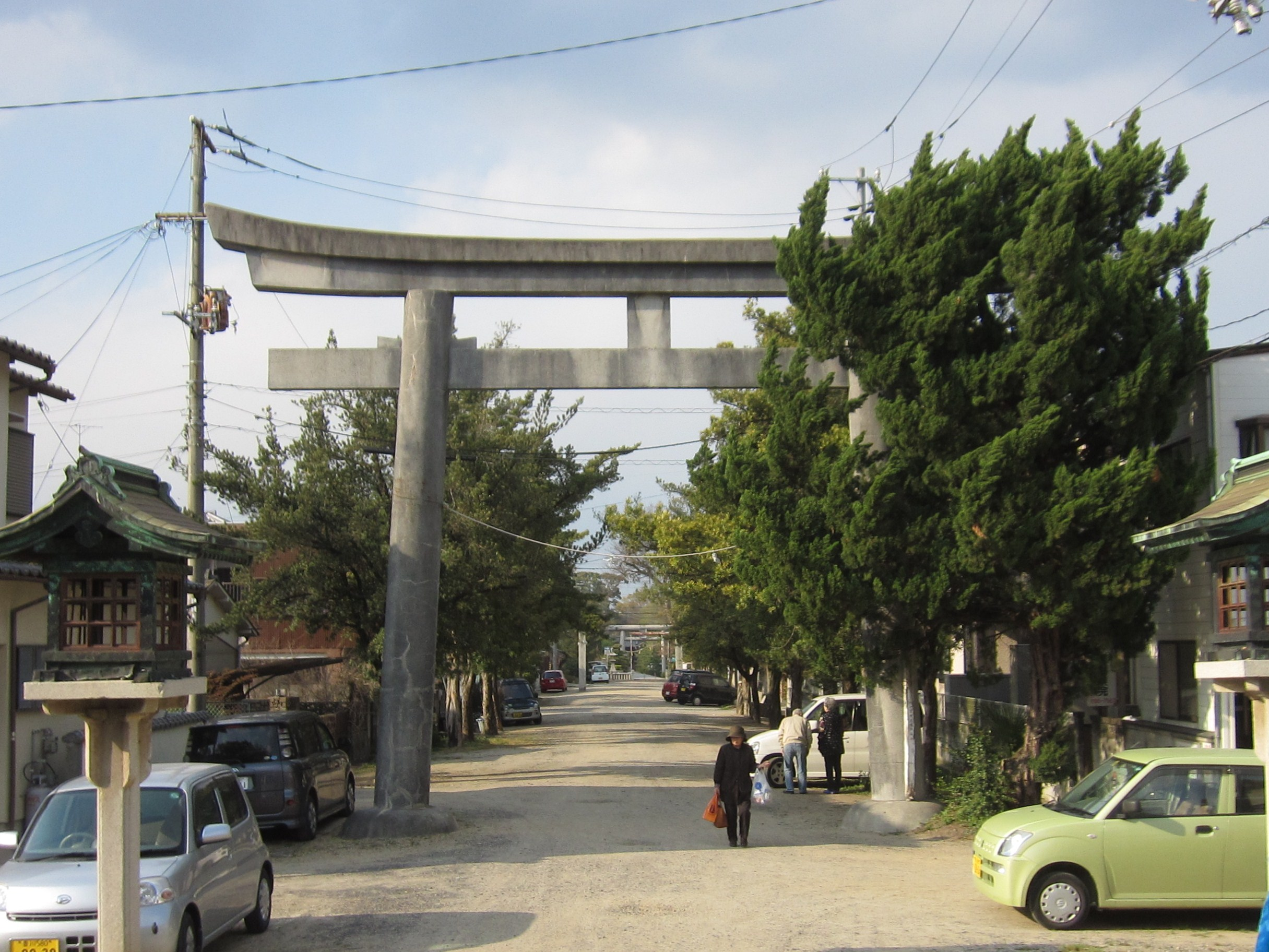
Ichi-no-Torii

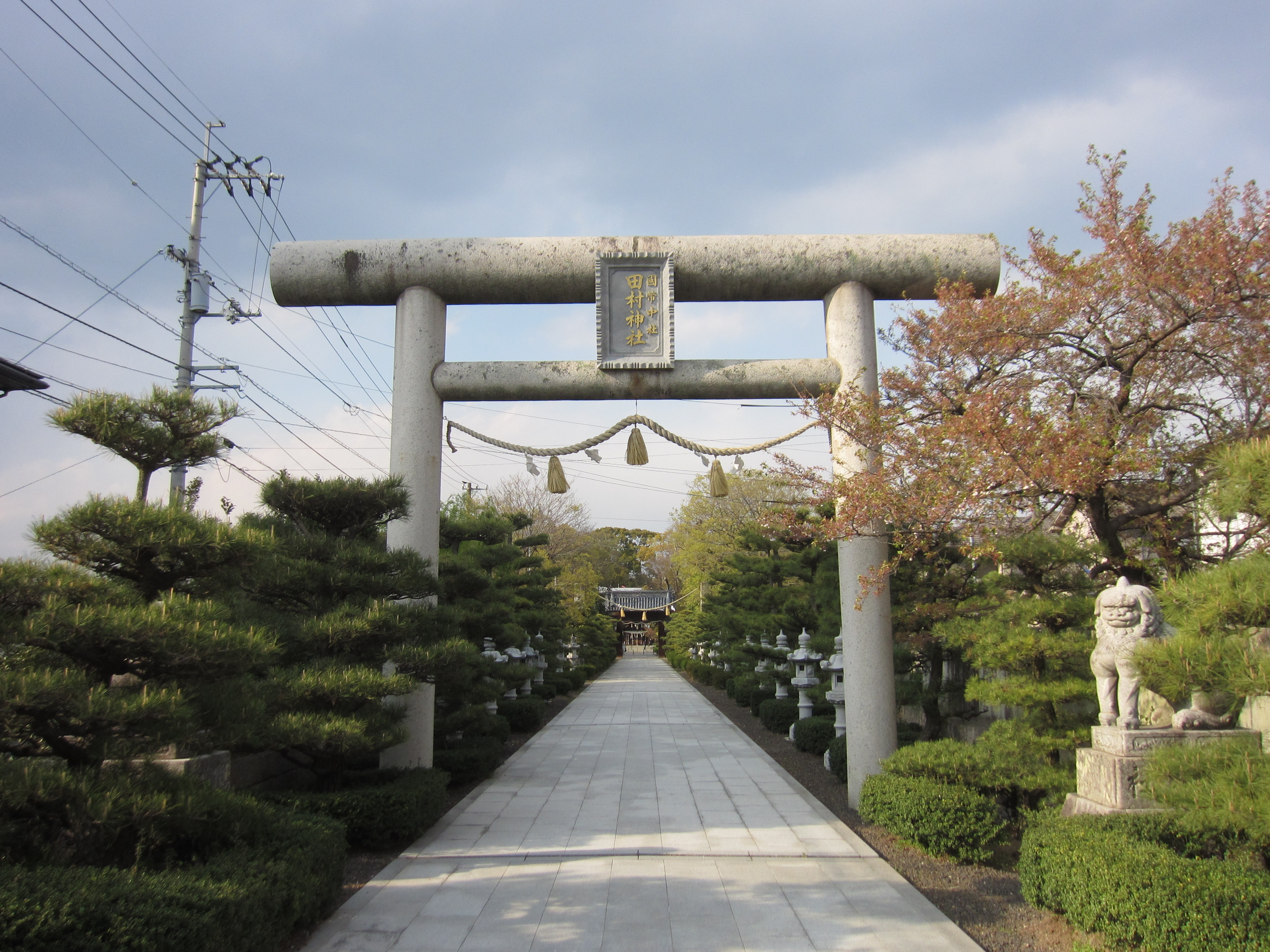
Ni-no-Torii

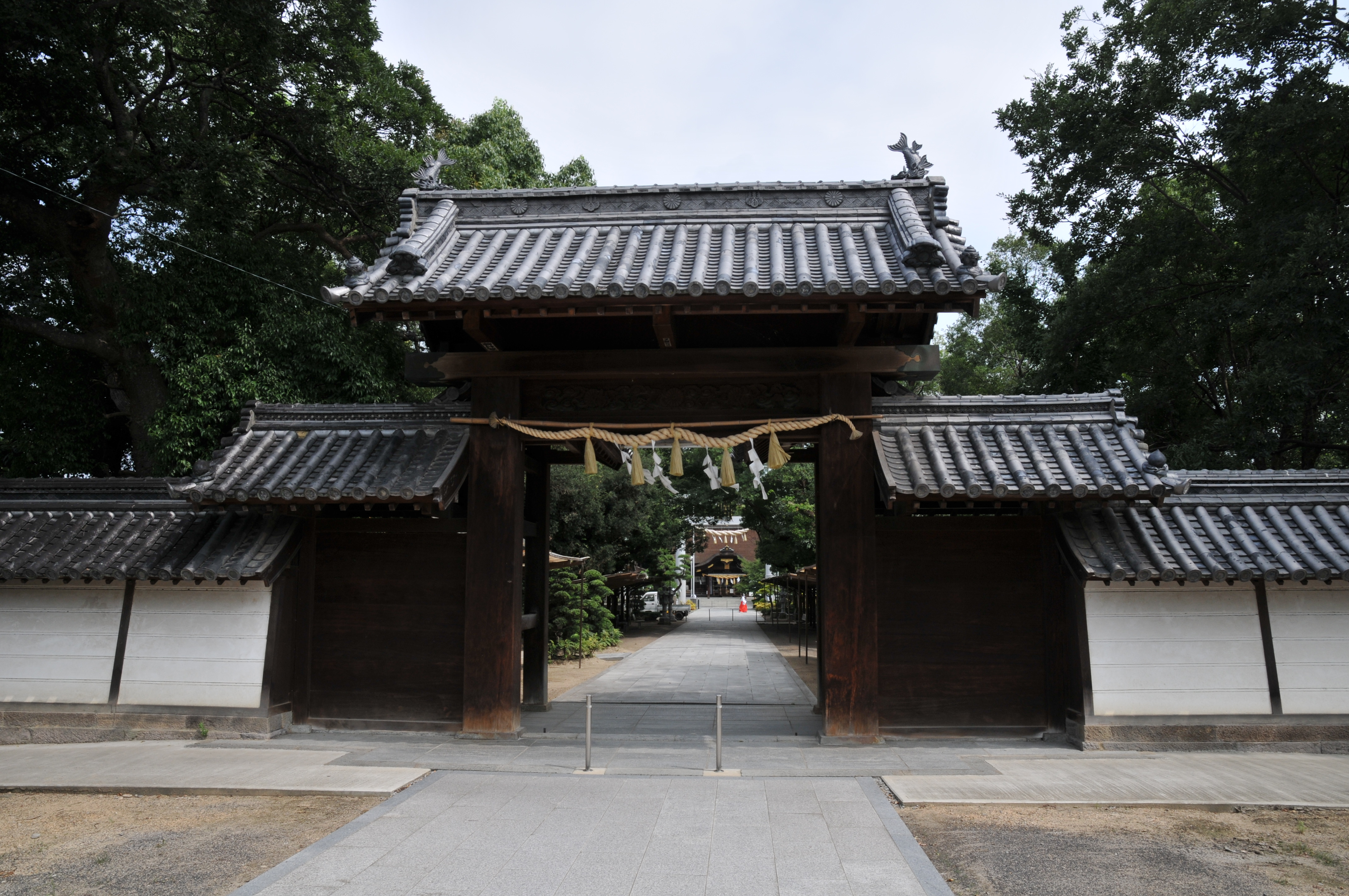
Zuishinmon Gate

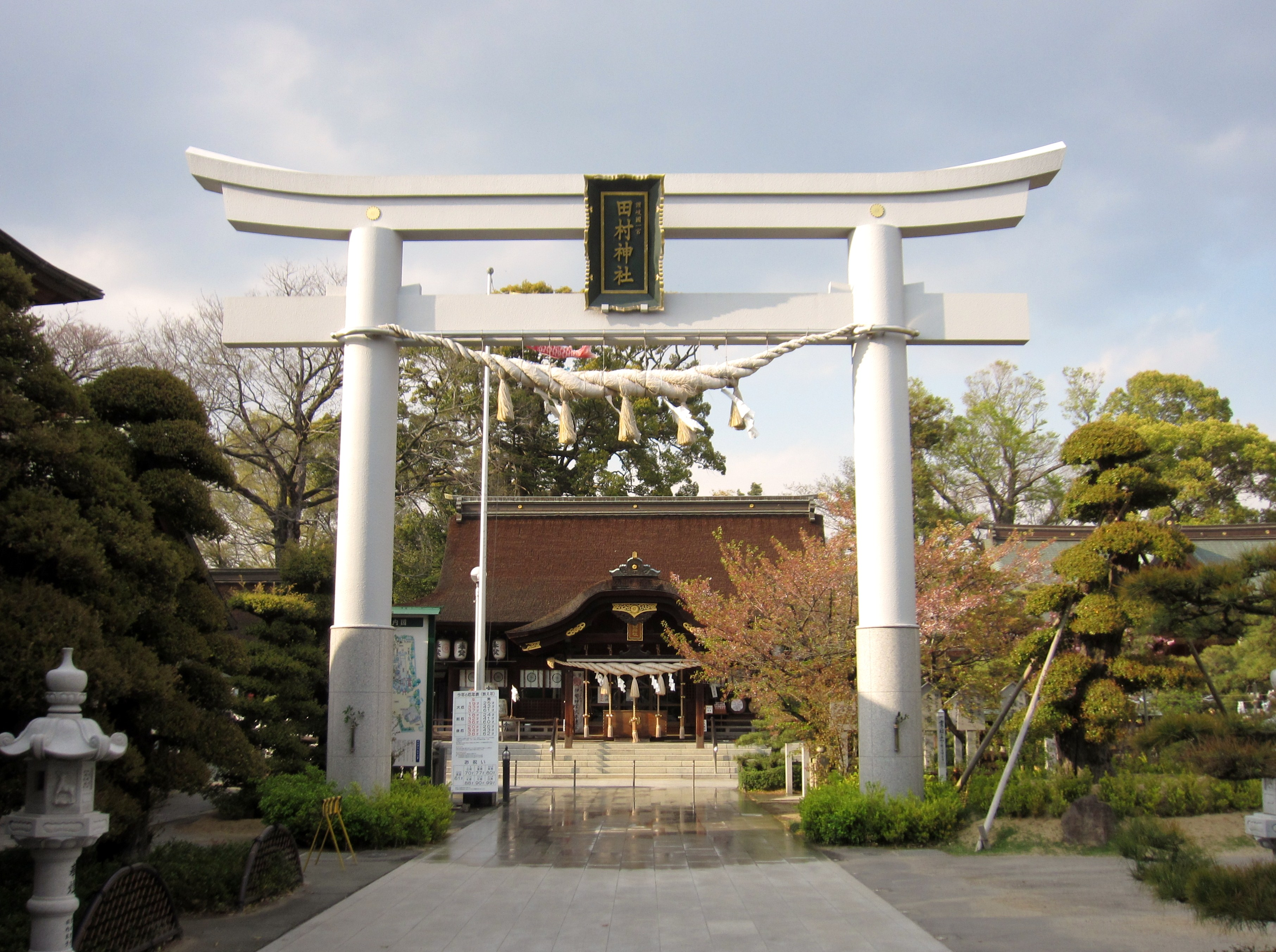
San-no-Torii

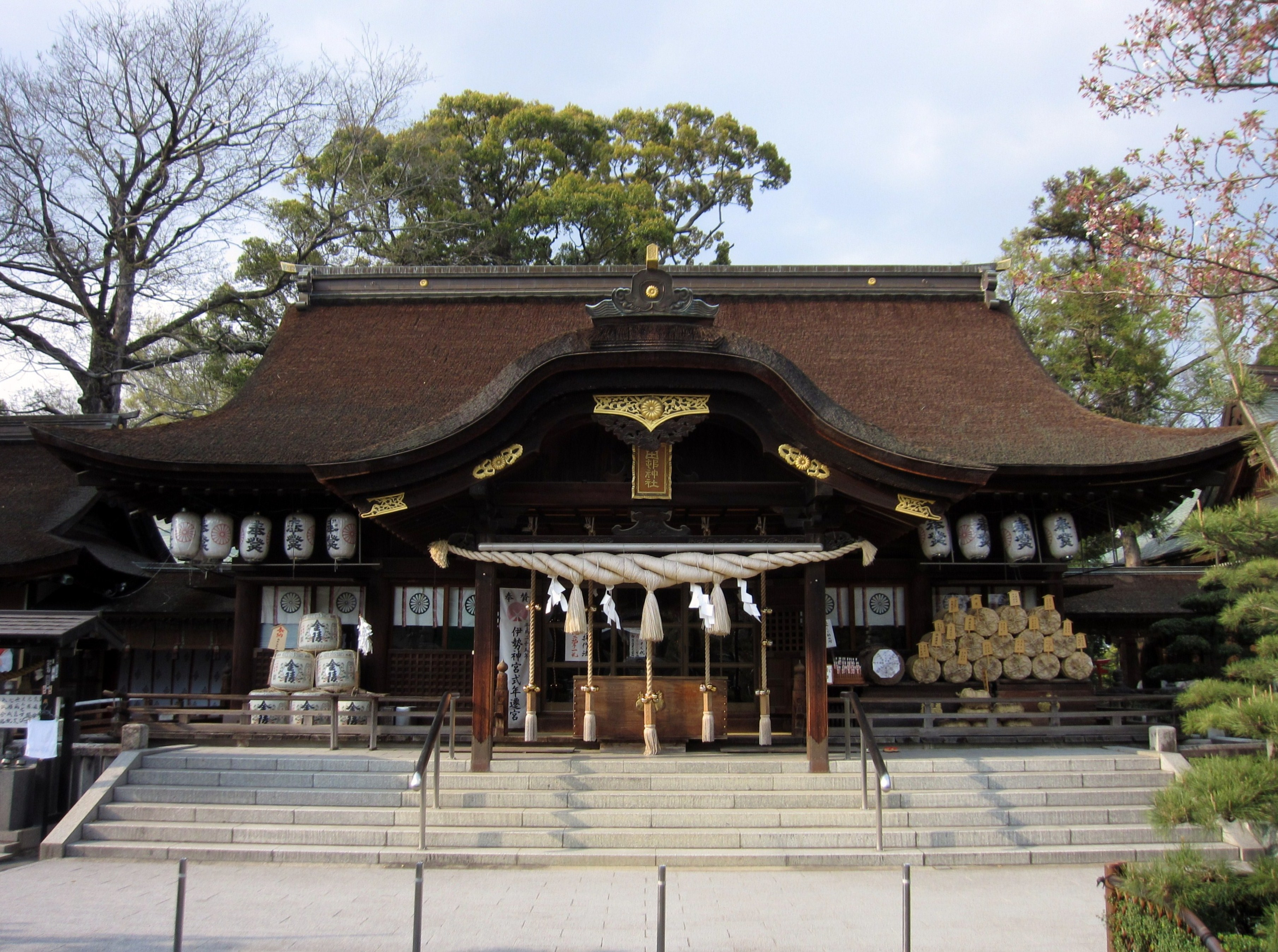
Haiden

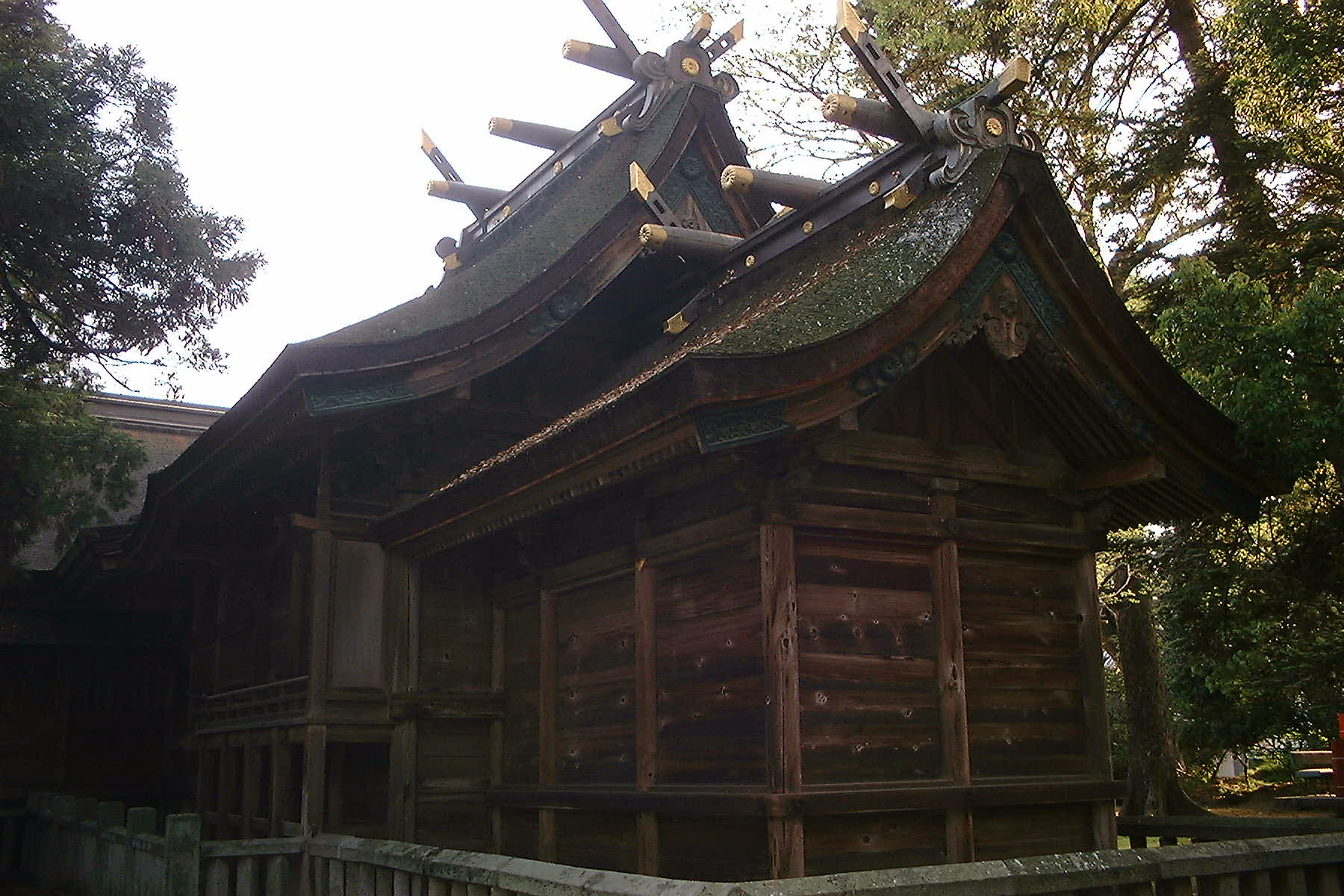
Honsha, Okudono

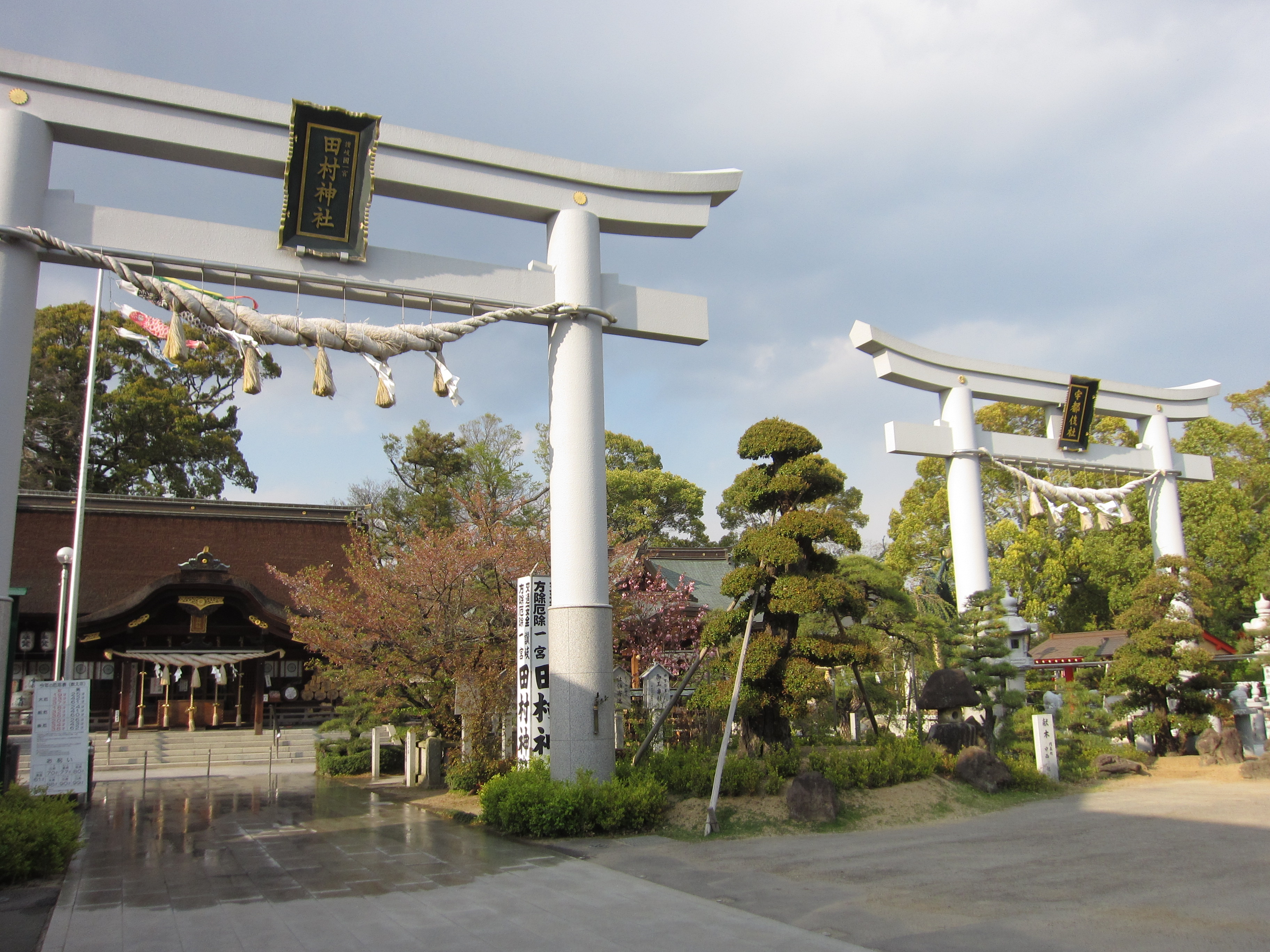
Precincts

== Cultural properties ==
- Ancient Treasures of Tamura Jinja (田村神社古神宝類), Kofun to Heian period; Tang Dynasty; consists of 1 spearhead, 3 bronze mirrors and one fragment of a bronze mirror

== See also ==
- List of Shinto shrines
- Ichinomiya
