= Fukuyama Castle (Sōja) =

- 福山城
- Sōja, Okayama, Japan
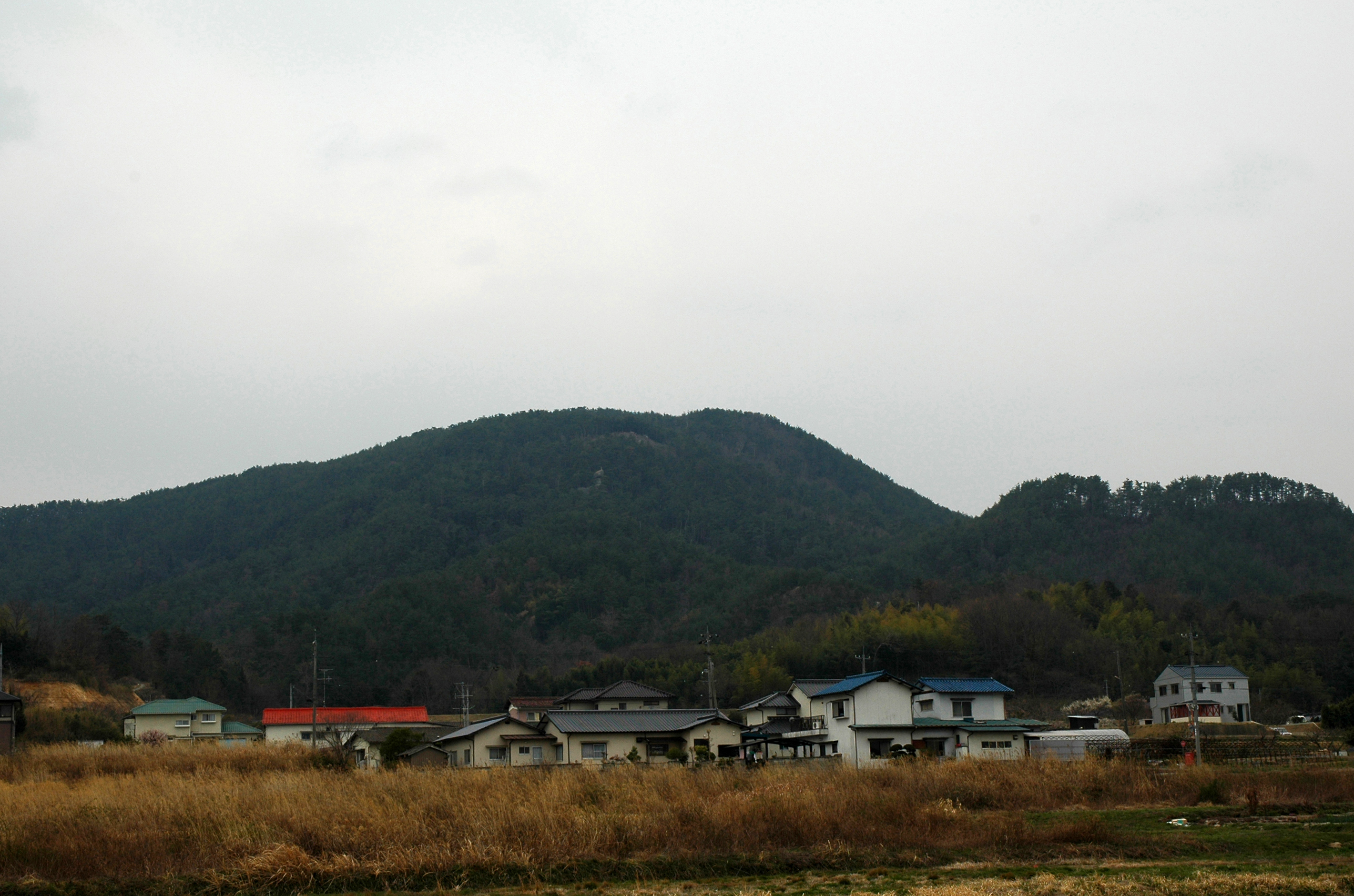
- Mount Fukuyama

Site information
- Type: yamashiro-style Japanese castle
- Condition: ruins

Location
- Fukuyama Castle Fukuyama Castle (Japan)
- Coordinates: 34°38′47.26″N 133°45′35.38″E

Site history
- Built: 1335
- Built by: Shō Kanesuke
- In use: 1336
- Battles/wars: Battle of Fukuyama (1336)

Fukuyama Castle (福山城, Fukuyama-jō) of Bitchū Province was a Nanboku-chō period yamajiro-style Japanese castle located in what is today the Kiyonemiyori neighborhood of the city of Sōja in Okayama Prefecture. Its ruins have been protected by the central government as a National Historic Site since 1936.

== History ==
Fukuyama Castle is located on Mount Fukuyama (elevation 302 meters) in the southern part of the city of Sōja. From the Nara period to the Kamakura period the mountain was occupied by a Buddhist temple called Fukusan-ji. In 1335, at the start of the Nanboku-chō period, the site was fortified by a local warlord, Shō Kanesuke, and entrusted to his retainer Makabe Korehisa. The castle consisted of three rings of fortifications and enclosures on the slopes of the mountain. This castle became the site of the "Battle of Fukuyama" as described in the Taiheiki.

=== Battle of Fukuyama ===
In February 1336, Ashikaga Takauji, who had been defeated in Kyoto and pursued to Kyushu by the forces of Emperor Go-Daigo the previous year, had assembled a new army, and began to his counterattack to the east with 300,000 men. On reaching Kuniyo-no-ura in Bingo Province, the army was divided into two groups, with Takauji taking a third of the force by ships on the Seto Inland Sea to directly attack the Kinai region, while his brother Ashikaga Tadayoshi lead the remainder up the San'yōdō highway by land. On April 3, Ōida Ujitsuna, a general in the vanguard of Nitta Yoshisada's army loyal to Emperor Go-Daigo laid siege to Shō Kanesuke at Fukuyama Castle to block the Ashikaga army from advancing further eastward. The Ashikaga army reached the castle on May 14, and with overwhelming numerical superiority, soon surrounded Ōida forces. However, despite being greatly outnumbered, Ōida fought well and inflicted 20,000 casualties on the Ashikaga before the castle fell. Ōida also managed to escape the fall of the castle with a small force of 400 men and continued to harass the Ashikaga army from his stronghold at Mitsuishi Castle in Bizen Province near the border with Harima. However, only seven days after the fall of Fukushima Castle, Nitta Yoshisada was killed in combat at the Battle of Minatogawa, which led to the collapse and defeat of Emperor Go-Daigo's forces.

== Present situation ==
At present, nothing remains of the castle except for remnants of earthworks, dry moats, wells, and fragments of stone walls of the castle gate. Archaeological excavations have found roof tiles and a kiln ruin thought to have been from the Buddhist temple originally on the site.

== See also ==
- List of Historic Sites of Japan (Okayama)

== Literature ==
- De Lange, William (2021). An Encyclopedia of Japanese Castles. Groningen: Toyo Press. pp. 600 pages. ISBN 978-9492722300.
- Sansom, George (1961). A History of Japan: 1334–1615. Stanford, California: Stanford University Press
- Turnbull, Stephen (1998). The Samurai Sourcebook. London: Cassell & Co.
