= Ichinomiya-ji =

- 一宮寺
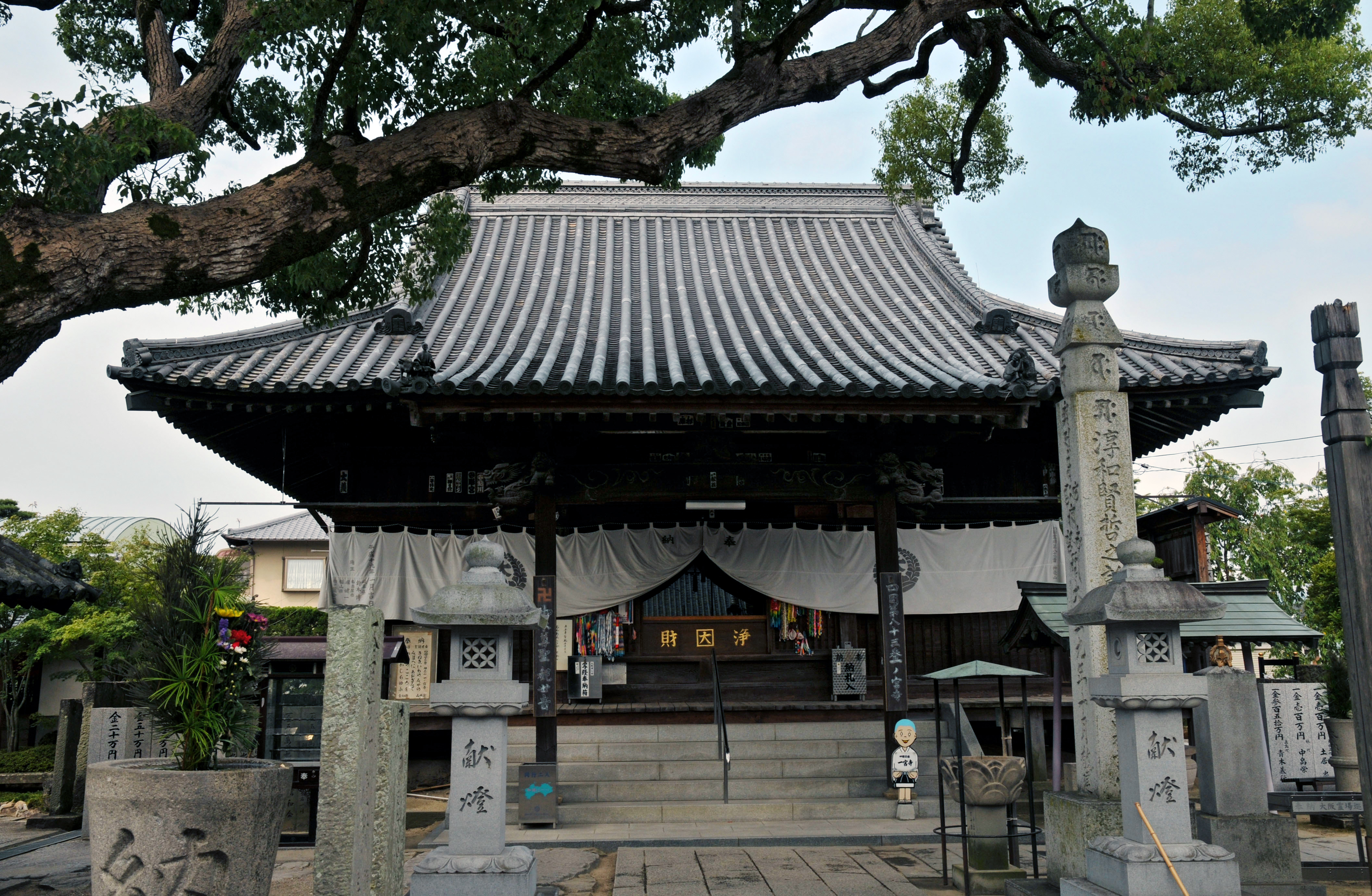

Religion
- Affiliation: Buddhism
- Sect: Shingon

Location
- Country: Japan
- Interactive map of Ichinomiya-ji

Ichinomiya-ji (Japanese: 一宮寺) is a temple of the Omuro School of Shingon Buddhism, located in Ichinomiya-cho, Takamatsu City, Kagawa Prefecture. Its formal mountain name is Shingōzan, and its sub-temple name is Daihōin. The principal deity is Shō Kannon Bodhisattva. It serves as the 83rd temple on the Shikoku Pilgrimage. It is situated adjacent to Tamura Shrine, the Ichinomiya (chief shrine) of the former Sanuki Province.

- Mantra of the Principal Deity: Om Arorikya Sowaka
- Pilgrimage Verse (Goeika): Having come to gaze in reverence before the shrine of Sanuki’s Ichinomiya—who among us can truly fathom the heart of the Divine?
- Pilgrimage Stamp (Nōkyō-in): Stamp of the Temple's Principal Deity; Commemorative Stamp for the "Cauldron of Hell" (Jigoku no Kama)

== History ==
According to temple tradition, the site was established by Gien during the Taihō era (701–704) as a temple of the Hossō sect; it is said to have been named Taihō-in in honor of the era name. Later, during the Wadō era—when *Ichinomiya* (provincial head shrines) were officially designated throughout the various provinces—Gyōki reportedly renovated the temple buildings and renamed the site Ichinomiya-ji, serving as the first *bettō* (administrator-priest) for the Ichinomiya of Sanuki Province, Tamura Shrine. Subsequently, during the Daidō era (806–810), Kūkai (Kōbō-Daishi) undertook a comprehensive restoration of the temple complex; he carved and enshrined a 106-centimeter statue of Shō Kannon (Holy Avalokiteśvara Bodhisattva) and formally converted the temple to the Shingon sect.

Although the temple was destroyed by fire in 1574 (the second year of the Tenshō era) amidst hostilities between the Miyoshi forces of Awa Province and the Kōzai clan, it was subsequently restored by the eminent priest Yūsei (as recorded in the *Nankai Chiran-ki*). While the temple's official website currently states that it was burned down by the army of Chōsokabe Motochika, this assertion is historically inaccurate. The *Sanuki Ichinomiya Seisuiki*—a historical record detailing the temple's origins and vicissitudes—explicitly notes that during the period of Chōsokabe rule, the temple's territorial holdings remained intact and secure; it was only later, under the authority of Hideyoshi, that these lands were confiscated. However, modern accounts regarding Ichinomiya-ji have been distorted to align with a common narrative—shared by many other temples in the region—claiming that the site was destroyed by Chōsokabe forces. Caution is therefore advised, as there are numerous instances among temples in Shikoku where legends claiming destruction by Chōsokabe forces during the Tenshō era were fabricated in later periods. In Enpō 7 (1679), Tamura Shrine—at the behest of the then-Lord of the Takamatsu Domain, Matsudaira Yoritsune—transitioned from Ryōbu Shintō to Yuiitsu Shintō. Consequently, the twelve *miyadera* (shrine-temples) said to have existed alongside the shrine were abolished, with this temple being the sole exception permitted to survive. Although this temple had previously existed as an integral part of the shrine, situated on the very same grounds, it was formally separated and relocated to its current site. Its status as a *bettō-ji* (administrative temple) was dissolved; the statue of Shō Kannon, which had served as the shrine's *honji-butsu* (original Buddha), became the temple's principal object of worship; and the temple assumed the role of the 83rd sacred site on the Shikoku 88-Temple Pilgrimage—a designation previously held by the shrine in its capacity as the *Ichinomiya* (premier shrine) of the province.* Thus, a separation of Shintō and Buddhist elements was implemented here some two hundred years prior to the official separation decree of the early Meiji era, establishing the status quo that persists to this day.

(Note: It is believed that the specific pilgrimage site number—"83"—had not yet been formally assigned at this point in time.)

== Temple precincts ==
- Sanmon (Main Gate) / Niōmon (Two Deva Kings Gate)
- Hondō (Main Hall): The Maedachi Honzon (stand-in principal deity) is unveiled for public viewing annually on August 10th, starting at 6:00 PM, during the Sennichi-e (Thousand-Day Service).
- Daishidō (Founder's Hall): Visitors may view the statue of the Great Master (Kūkai) enshrined in the rear of the hall. Anyone may participate in a Shakyō (sutra copying) experience without a reservation (9:00 AM – 4:00 PM). The annual Kyūri Kaji (Cucumber Prayer Ritual) is held on the Doyō no Ushi day in July. The large double doors feature a carving of the character "Dai" (Great), representing Daihō-in.
- Gomadō (Fire Ritual Hall): Newly constructed in recent years, this hall houses a statue of Fudō Myōō (Acala), which is available for viewing. Goma (fire ritual) ceremonies are conducted on the 28th of every month, starting at 10:00 AM.
- Bosatsudō (Bodhisattva Hall): Enshrines Amida Nyorai (Amitabha Buddha) and the Twenty-Five Bodhisattvas.
- Nōkotsudō Sharira (Ossuary): Completed in December 2020. Constructed of reinforced concrete.

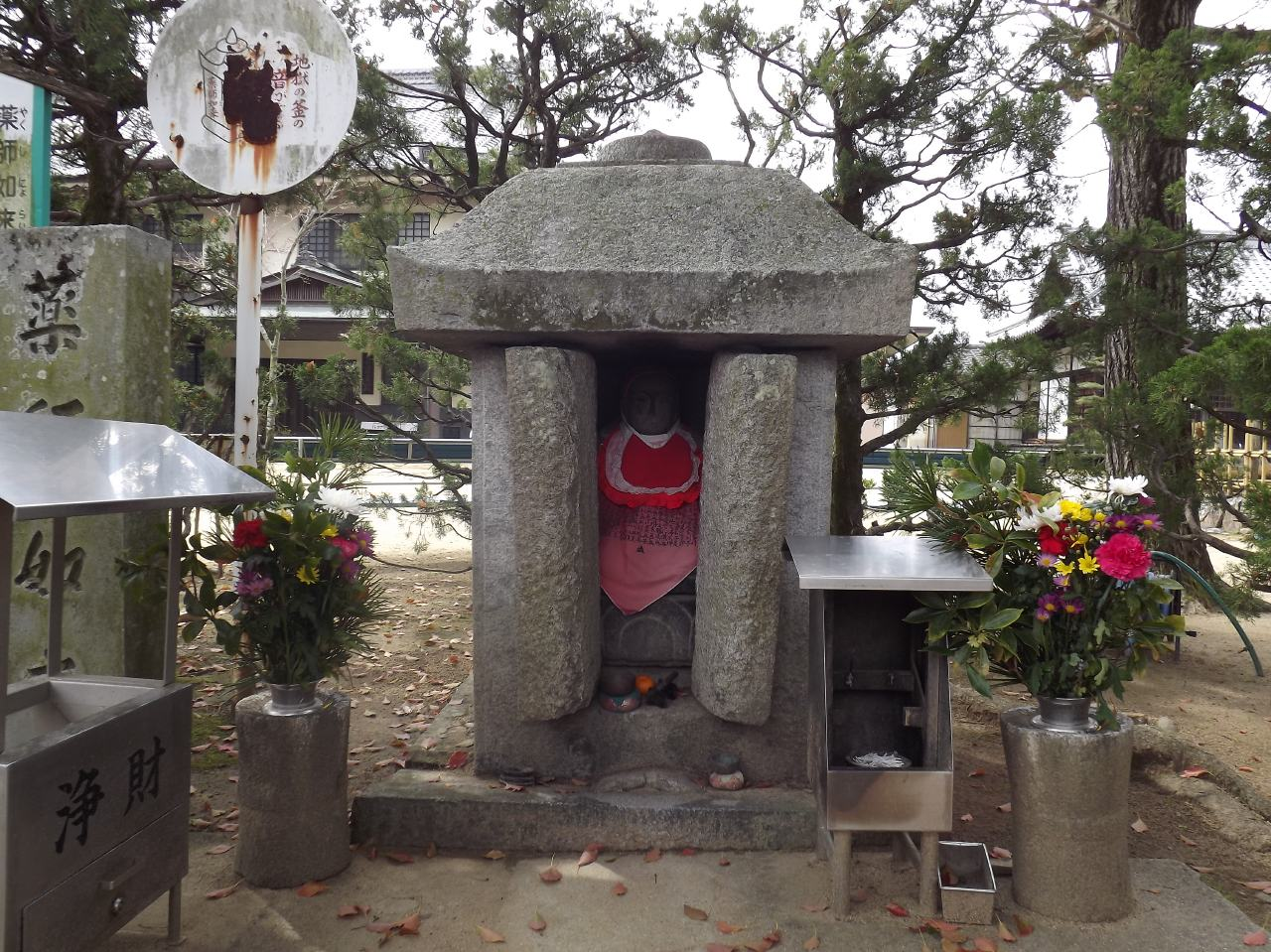
Shrine of Yakushi Nyorai

- Shrine of Yakushi Nyorai (Medicine Buddha): A small shrine said to emit the sound of a cauldron boiling in Hell; legend has it that if a person who has committed misdeeds inserts their head into the shrine, they will be unable to pull it back out.
- Ichinomiya Goryō (Imperial Mausoleum): Consists of three stone steles. These are believed to mark the tombs of Emperor Kōrei, Momosohime-no-Mikoto, and Isaserihiko-no-Mikoto.
- Kuhi (Haiku Monument): Features a haiku by Tadashi: "As incense smoke rises / in the twilight hour / a pilgrim walks at dusk." It is located behind the Ichinomiya Goryō.
- Nishimon (West Gate): The entrance accessed from the parking lot.

Typically, visitors arrive via the parking lot located in front of the Nishimon—situated on the rear side of the temple grounds, opposite the Niōmon. Entering from there leads to the area to the left of the Hondō; the Daishidō is located to the right of the Hondō, while the Gomadō is to the left of the Daishidō. The Nōkyōjo (Sutra-Stamping Office) is found on the left-hand side when walking from the Hondō toward the Niōmon, and the Shōrō (Bell Tower) is on the right. The Ichinomiya Goryō is situated behind the Temizuya (purification pavilion).

- Temple Lodging: None
- Parking: Available (Free)
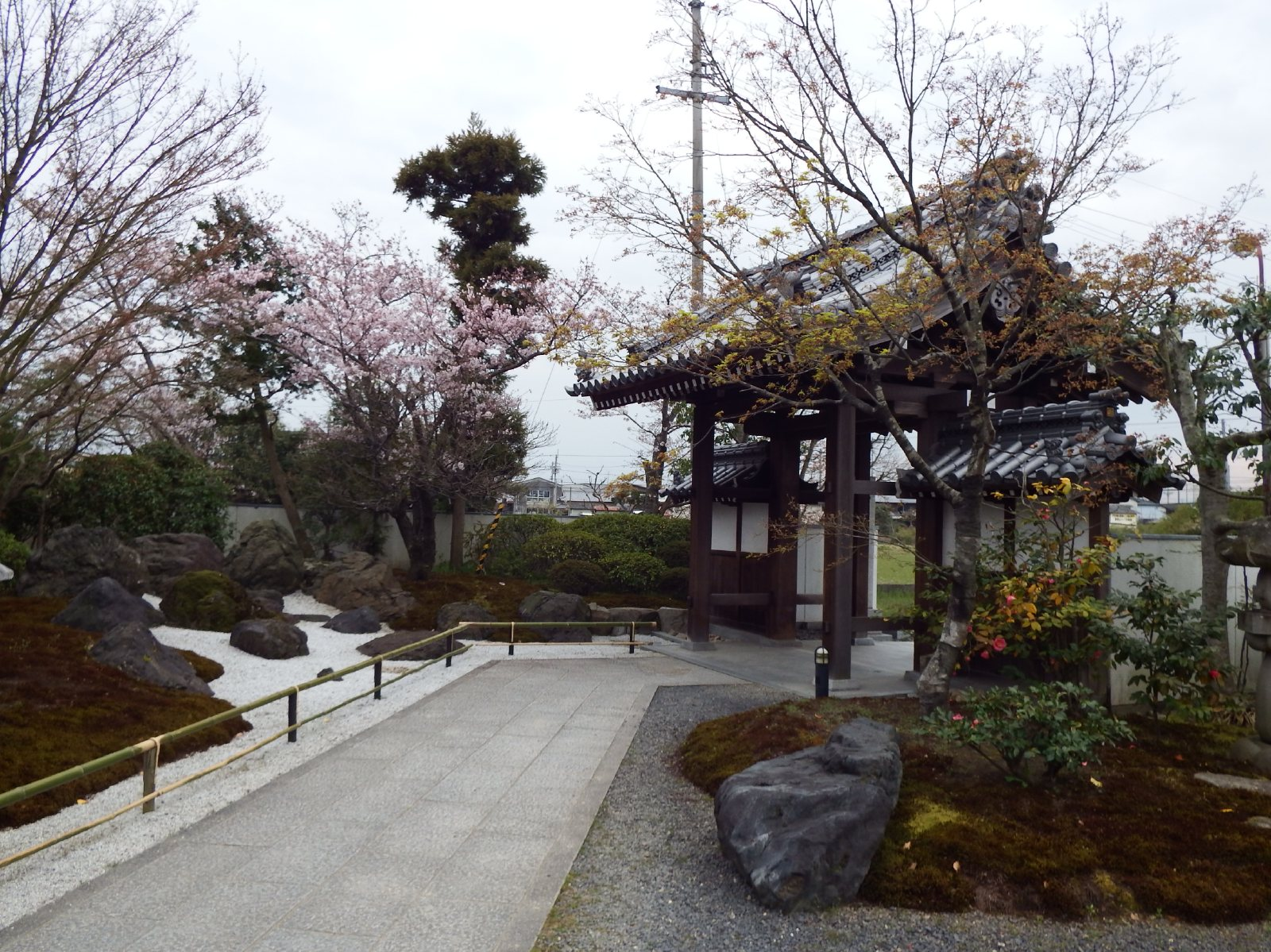
West Gate

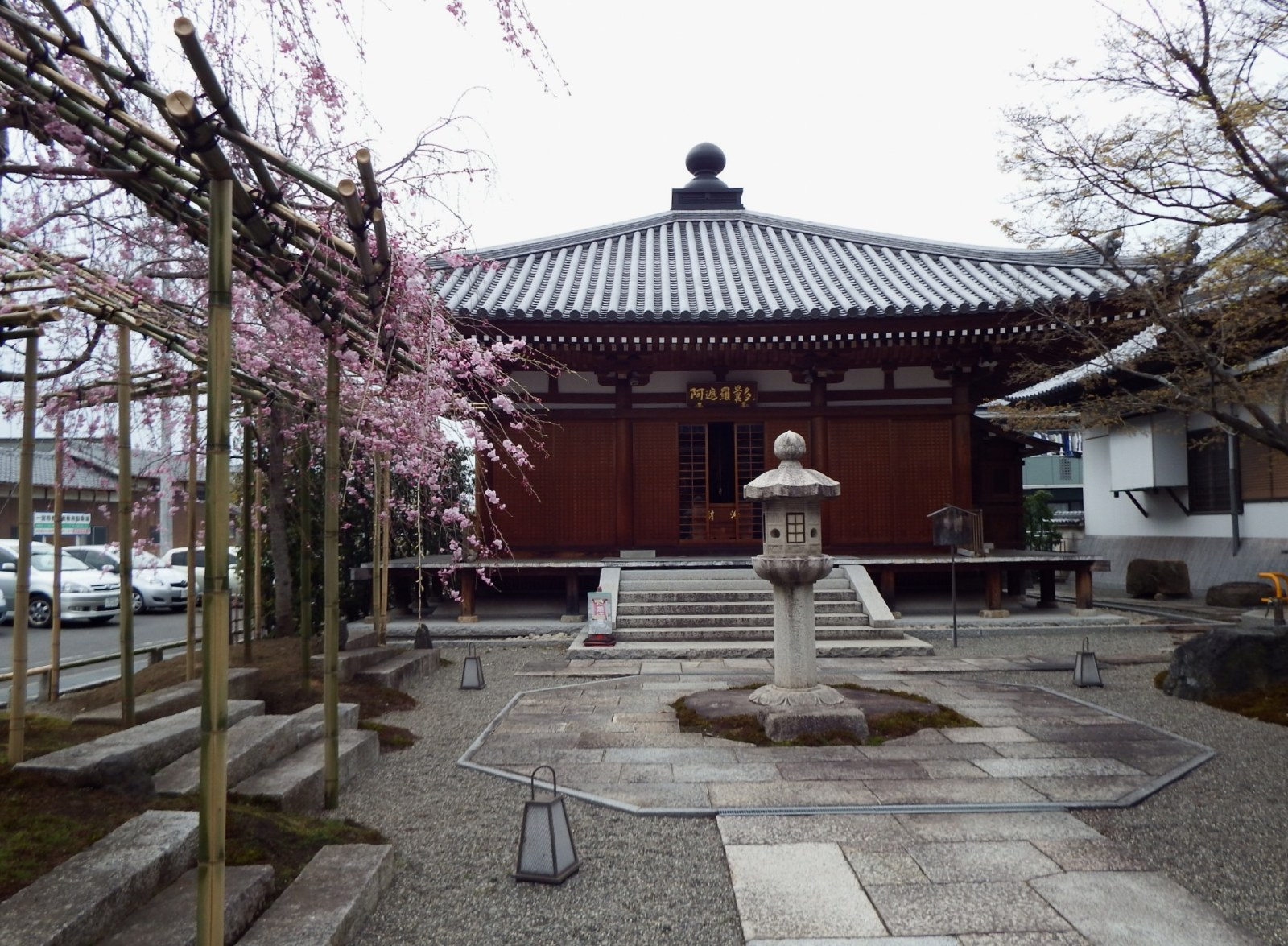
Goma Hall

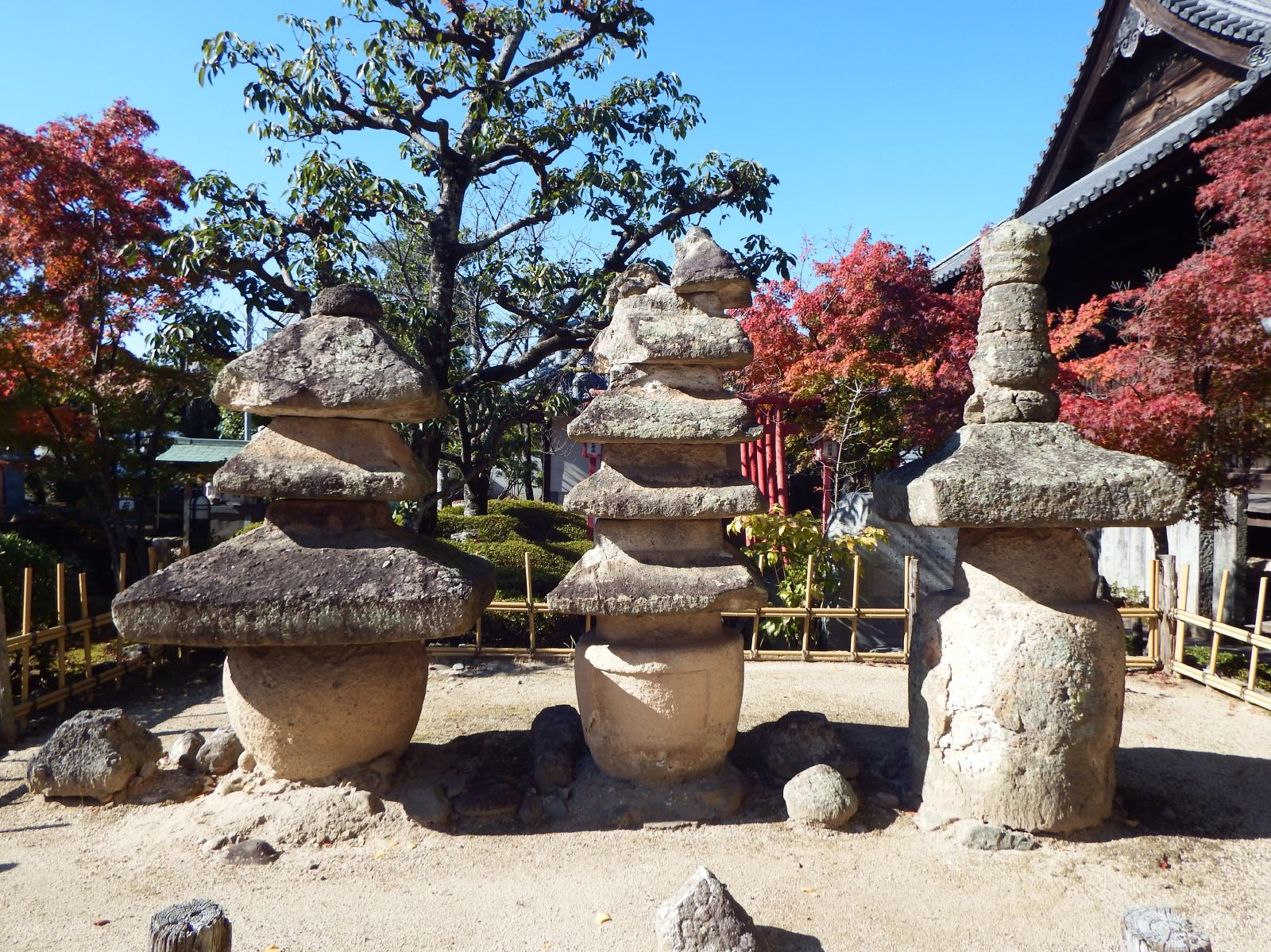
Ichinomiya Imperial Tomb

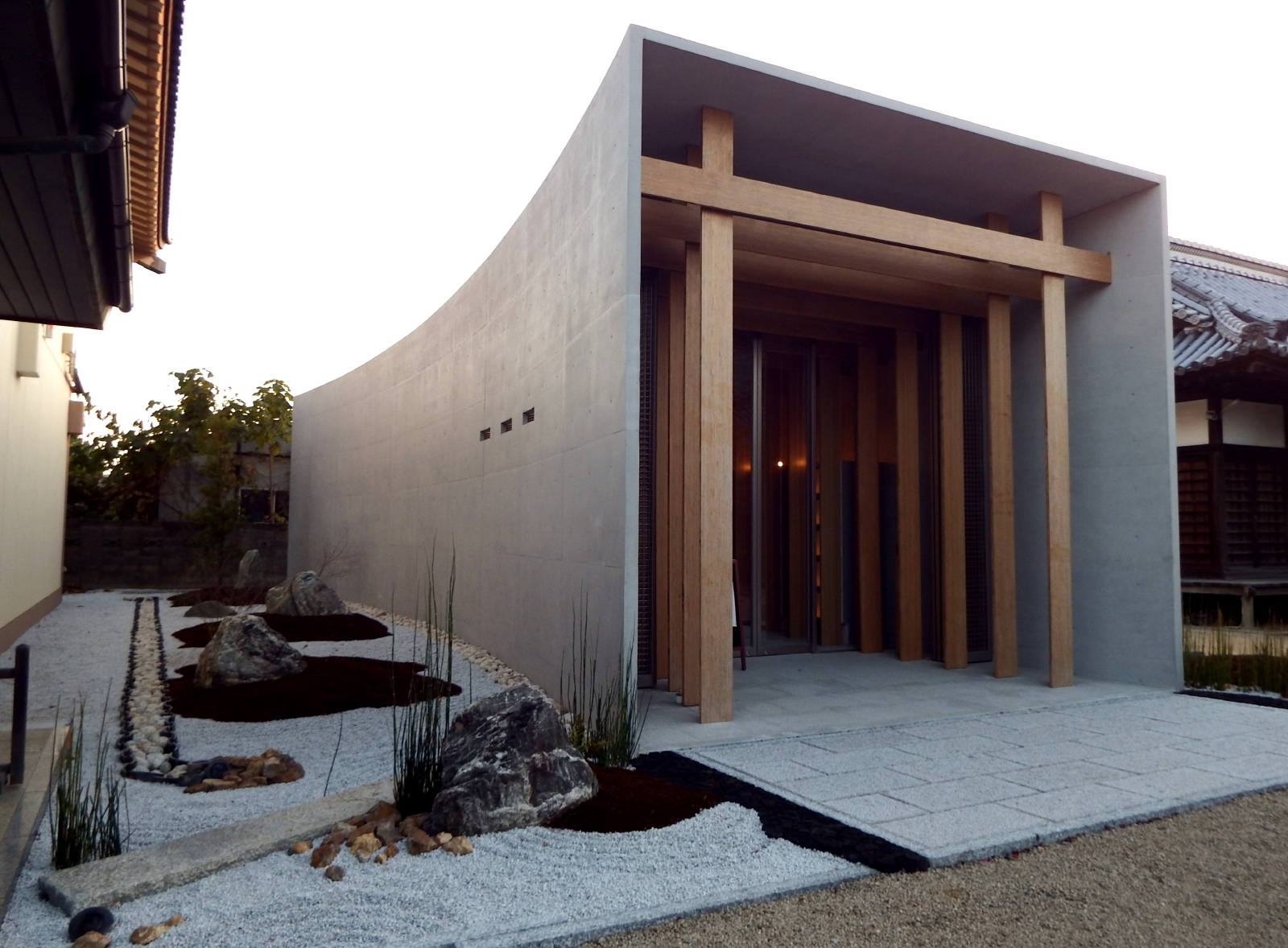
Ossuary (Sharira)

== Access ==
=== Rail ===
- Kotoden — Kotohira Line — Ichinomiya Station (0.9 km)

=== Bus ===
- Kotoden Bus — Kazuno Line: Alight at "Ichinomiya" (0.3 km)

=== Road ===
- Local Road: Kagawa Prefectural Route 12 (Miki-Kokubunji Line) — Ichinomiya (0.3 km)
- Expressway: Takamatsu Expressway — Takamatsu-Danshi IC / Takamatsu-Nishi IC (3.6 km)

== Neighboring temples ==
=== Shikoku Pilgrimage ===
82 Negoro-ji --(11.9 km)-- 83 Ichinomiyaji --(14.1 km)-- 84 Yashima-ji (Note: There are multiple routes for the pilgrimage path; the distances listed above are based on the standard route.)

== See also ==
- Shikoku Pilgrimage
- Tamura Shrine

== Bibliography ==
- Tateki Miyazaki (2007). Shikoku Pilgrimage: Walking Alone, Accompanied by Two. Vol. Map Volume (8th ed.). Henromichi Preservation Cooperation Association.
