= Tsukuriyama Kofun (Sōja) =

- 作山古墳 (Japanese)
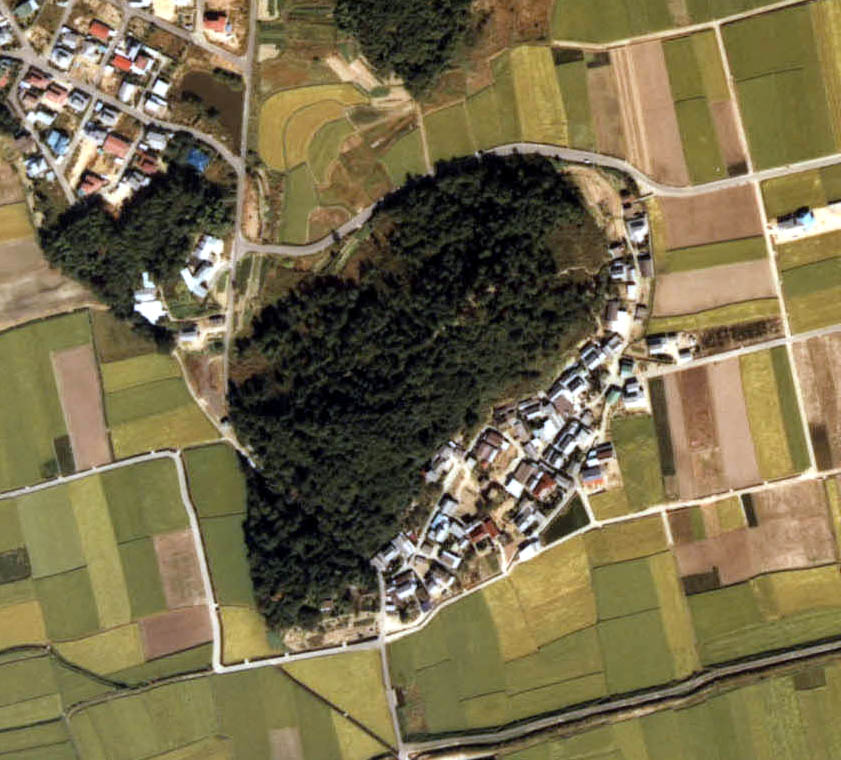
- Tsukuriyama Kofun

- Tsukuriyama Kofun Tsukuriyama Kofun (Sōja) (Japan)
- Interactive map of Tsukuriyama Kofun
- 34°39′51.18″N 133°46′8.52″E
- Type: Kofun
- Periods: Kofun period
- Location: Sōja, Okayama, Japan
- Region: San'yō region

History
- Built: early 5th century

Site notes
- Public access: Yes (no facilities)

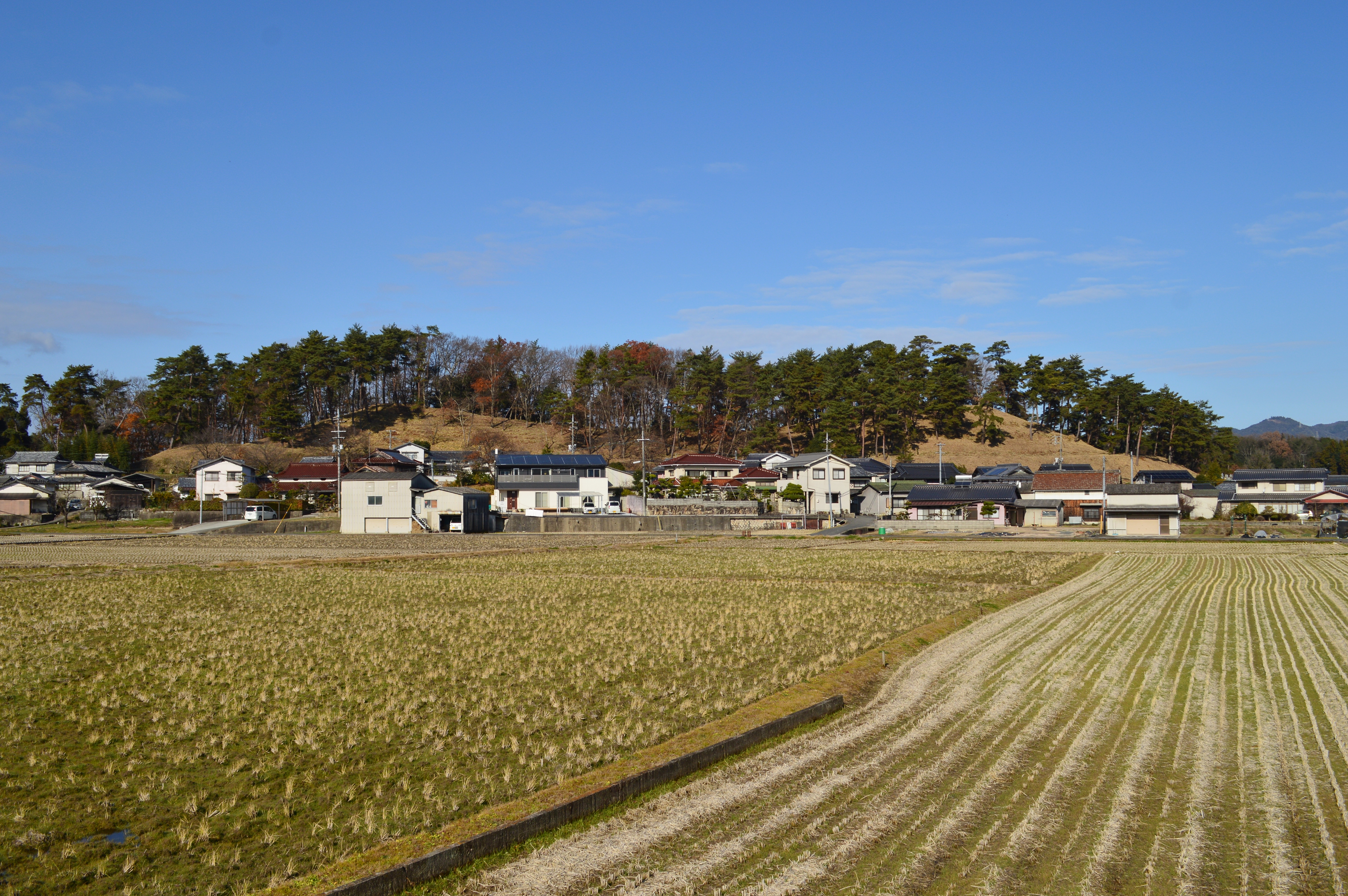
Panoramic view

Tsukuriyama Kofun (作山古墳) is a Kofun period burial mound located in the Misu neighborhood of Sōja, Okayama Prefecture, in the San'yō region of Japan. The tumulus was designated a National Historic Site of Japan in 1921. It is the second largest tumulus in Okayama Prefecture and the tenth largest in Japan, and is estimated to have been built in the middle of the 5th century (in the middle of the Kofun period).

== Overview ==
The Tsukuriyama Kofun is a zenpō-kōen-fun (前方後円墳), which is shaped like a keyhole when viewed from above, orientated to the southwest. The tumulus was constructed in three tiers and has a total length of 282 meters. The outer surface has fukiishi of breccia and rows of haniwa. No trace of a surrounding moat has been found. The tumulus has never been excavated, so details of the burial chamber are unknown; however, it is presumed to be intact, since no indication of robbery pits have been found. Most of the items unearthed from the Tsukuriyama Kofun are cylindrical and morning glory-shaped haniwa, and the total number is estimated to be as many as 5000. It is estimated that these were made in the second quarter of the 5th century.

The ancient San'yōdō highway passes through on south side of the tumulus, and it is speculated that the site was selected to show off the power of the ancient Kingdom of Kibi.

The Tsukuriyama Kofun has a number of unusual aspects to its design. The mound incorporated a natural hill, some portions of which remain intact, especially towards the anterior portion. There is also a trapezoidal protrusion at the front edge of the anterior part. The circular posterior mound is oval instead of circular, perhaps to make it look larger. The northern part of the tumulus remains in good condition, but the southern part has undergone major alterations due to the construction of private houses and roads. The Tsukuriyama Kofun is cleared of undergrowth in December, so the shape of the burial mound can be clearly seen around this time.

Total length
282 meters:
Anterior rectangular portion
170 meters wide x 23 meters high, 3-tier
Posterior circular portion
175 x 160 meters diameter x 24 meters high, 3-tiers

== See also ==
- List of Historic Sites of Japan (Okayama)
