= Mai Yajima =

Japanese singer

Mai Yajima 矢島舞依
- Born: April 28; Sōja, Okayama, Japan
- Origin: Kyoto
- Genres: Power metal; symphonic metal; heavy metal
- Occupations: Singer; songwriter
- Years active: 2013–present
- Label: South to North Records; Fitone
- Website: yajimamai.com

Mai Yajima (矢島舞依, Yajima Mai) is a Japanese heavy metal singer. Since her debut in 2013, she has released 2 studio albums, 6 EPs and 5 singles.

== Biography ==
Yajima was born on April 28 in Sōja, Okayama Prefecture. She later moved to Kyoto. She grew up listening to enka music and anime songs. She also listened to Japanese visual kei and metal bands.

She came to Tokyo to start working as a voice actress, but she eventually decided to become a singer. Her debut single, "Kodou" (鼓動, "Pulse"), was released in January 2014. The titular song was used as an ending theme for the live-action adaptation of the Nijimaru Rangers (疾風・虹丸組) manga. It was followed by the release of "Signal" (シグナル) in August 2014 and "Youzai" (有罪) in April 2015.

Mai Yajima's logo

Since January 2016, she has been performing with a backing band. "The Un-Dead", her first EP, was released in June 2016. It was followed by "Bloodthirsty" in January 2017 and "Innocent Emotion" in December 2017. Her first full-length album, Vampiress, was released in October 2018. It was followed by three EPs: "Hell on Earth" (2020), "Heaven Knows" (2020) and "Heretical Soul" (2021). "Heretical Soul" was ranked No. 7 on Oricon's weekly Indies Albums chart. Her second full-length album, Metamorphose, was released in May 2022, debuting at No. 4 on the Indies Albums chart.

== Influences ==
According to Yajima, because of her grandfather she grew up listening to enka singers, such as Nana Mizuki, Sayuri Ishikawa, Harumi Miyako, Fuyumi Sakamoto, but also the heavy metal band Onmyo-Za. Next, she started listening to visual kei bands, like The Gazette, Dir En Grey, Sid, D and Girugamesh. She also mentioned enjoying Western bands: Slipknot, The Agonist and Korn.

== Band personnel ==
- Tsuyoshi Ōnishi – bass
- Shimobe KC – drums
- ShinyA – guitar
- Kazuma – guitar

== Discography ==
=== Studio albums ===
- Vampiress (2018)
- Metamorphose (2022)

=== EPs ===
- "The Un-Dead" (2016)
- "Bloodthirsty" (2017)
- "Innocent Emotion" (2017)
- "Hell on Earth" (2020)
- "Heaven Knows" (2020)
- "Heretical Soul" (2021)

=== Singles ===
- "Kodou" (2014)
- "Signal" (2014)
- "Youzai" (2015)
- "Vampire Maiden" (2016)
- "Second Dead" (2018)
