= Sōja =

Sōja 総社市
- City
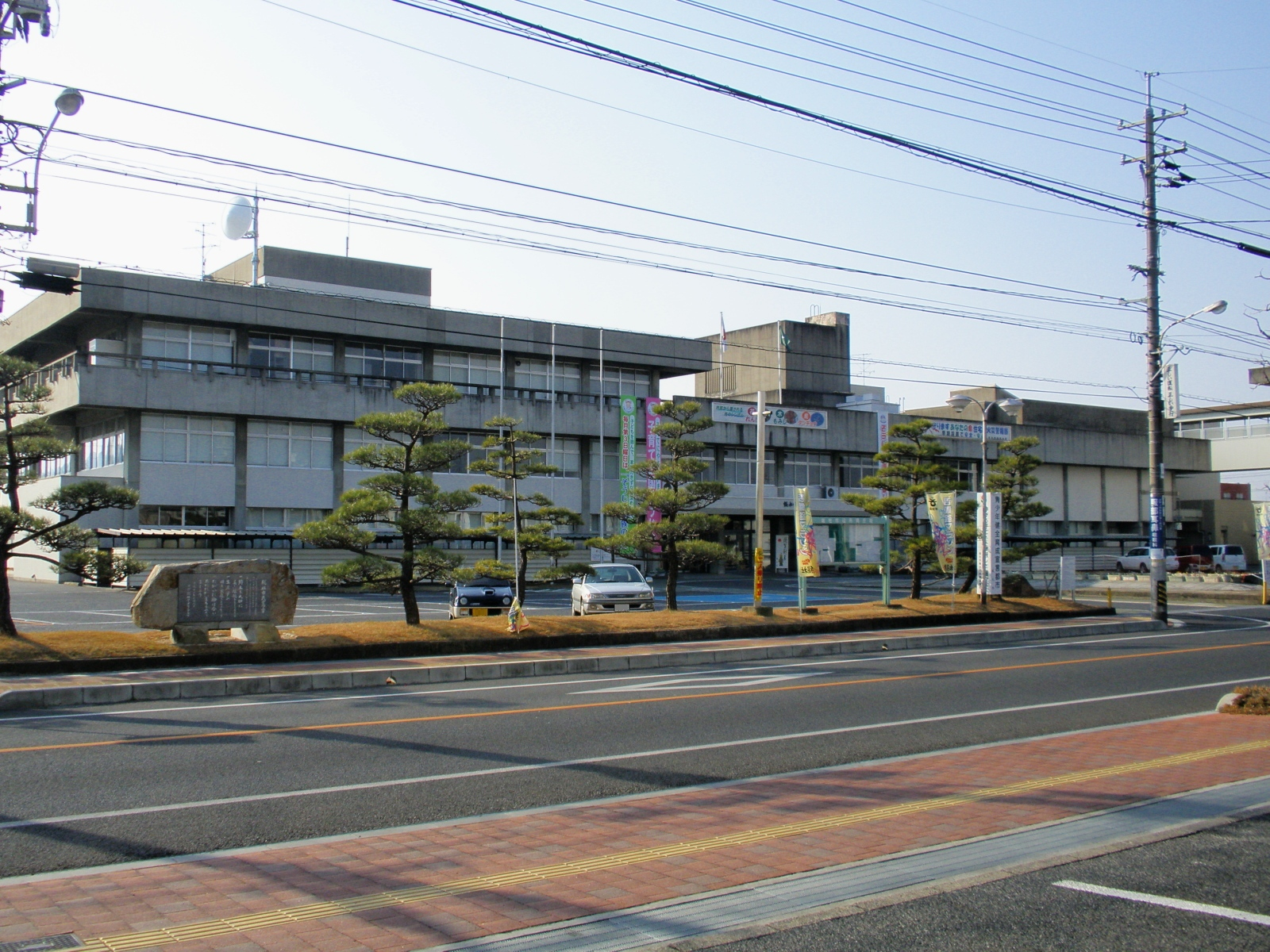
- Sōja City Hall

- Flag Seal
- Location of Sōja in Okayama Prefecture

- Location in Japan
- Coordinates: 34°40′22″N 133°44′47″E
- Country: Japan
- Region: Chūgoku (San'yō)
- Prefecture: Okayama

Government
  - Mayor: Soichi Kataoka (since October 2007)

Area
  - Total: 211.90 km^{2} (81.82 sq mi)

Population (March 31, 2023)
  - Total: 69,428
  - Density: 327.65/km^{2} (848.60/sq mi)
- Time zone: UTC+09:00 (JST)
- City hall address: 1-1-1 Chuo, Sōja-shi, Okayama-ken 719-1192
- Website: Official website
- Symbols
- Bird: Crane
- Flower: Astragalus
- Tree: Maple Leaf

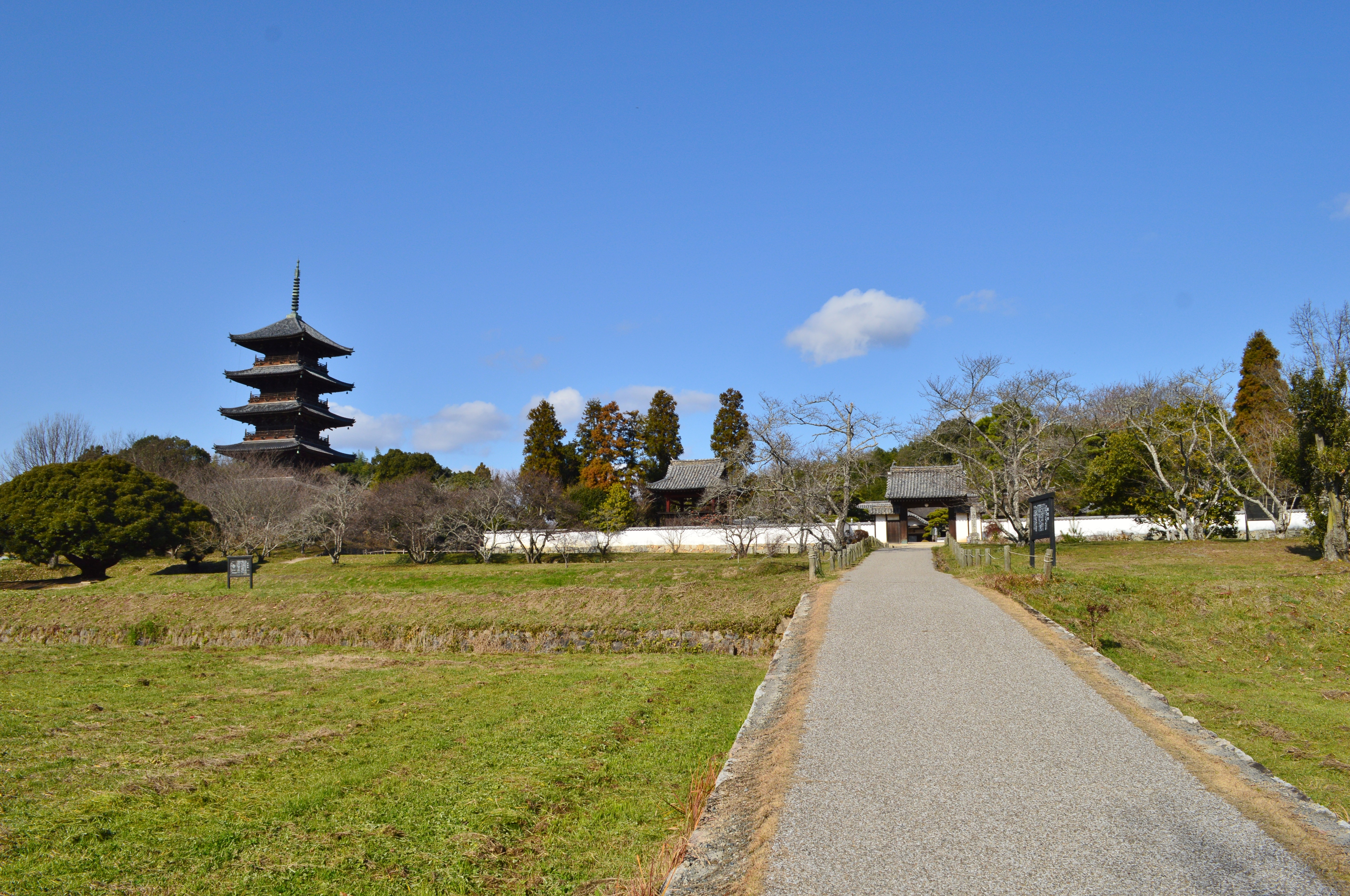
Bitchū Kokubun-ji

Sōja (総社市, Sōja-shi) is a city located in Okayama Prefecture, Japan. As of 31 March 2023, the city had an estimated population of 69,428 and a population density of 330 persons per km^{2}. The total area of the city is 211.90 square kilometres (81.82 sq mi).

== Geography ==
Sōja is located ancestral Okayama Prefecture. The Takahashi River runs through the city from northwest to south. The northern and western parts are located in the southern part of the Kibi plateau, and the southern part also forms a hilly area. The central area, which is the urban area, originally formed a small basin in the floodplain of the Takahashi River.

=== Adjacent municipalities ===
Okayama Prefecture

- Ibara
- Kibichūō
- Kita-ku, Okayama
- Kurashiki
- Takahashi
- Yakage

=== Rivers ===
- Makidani River
- Shinpon River
- Takahashi River

=== Mountains ===
- Kijōyama
- Mount Fuku
- Mount Karube

=== Climate ===
Sōja has a humid subtropical climate (Köppen climate classification Cfa) with very warm summers and cool winters. The average annual temperature in Sōja is 14.7 °C. The average annual rainfall is 1392 mm with September as the wettest month. The temperatures are highest on average in July, at around 26.6 °C, and lowest in January, at around 3.5 °C.

== Demographics ==
Per Japanese census data, the population of Sōja has been increasing for the past 50 years.

Historical population
| Year | Pop. | ±% |
|---|---|---|
| 1920 | 38,074 | — |
| 1930 | 38,148 | +0.2% |
| 1940 | 38,119 | −0.1% |
| 1950 | 49,227 | +29.1% |
| 1960 | 47,564 | −3.4% |
| 1970 | 48,444 | +1.9% |
| 1980 | 56,865 | +17.4% |
| 1990 | 61,459 | +8.1% |
| 2000 | 66,201 | +7.7% |
| 2010 | 66,216 | +0.0% |

== History ==
The Sōja area is part of ancient Bitchū Province and was the center of the ancient Kingdom of Kibi. The Tsukuriyama Kofun, the 10th largest burial mound in Japan, and the mountain-fortress of Ki Castle are among the many surviving relics of that period. During the Nara period, the Bitchū Kokubun-ji and provincial capital were located in what is now Sōja. The area prospered in the Muromachi period onwards as a "temple town" at the gates of the Bitchū-no-kuni Sōja-gū from which it derives its name.

Following the Meiji restoration, the village of Sōja was established with the creation of the modern municipalities system on April 1, 1889 and was raised to town status on February 26, 1896. Sōja was elevated to city status on March 31, 1954. On March 22, 2005, the villages of Yamate and Kiyone (both from Tsukubo District) were merged into Sōja.

== Government ==
Sōja has a mayor-council form of government with a directly elected mayor and a unicameral city council of 22 members. Sōja contributes two members to the Okayama Prefectural Assembly. In terms of national politics, the city is part of the Okayama 3rd district of the lower house of the Diet of Japan.

== Economy ==
Sōja has a mixed economy. Production of automobile parts dominates the local industry, although food processing is also important. The city also has a strong agricultural sector.

== Education ==
Sōja has 13 public elementary schools and three public junior high schools and one public compulsory education School operated by the city government, and two public high schools operated by the Okayama prefectural Board of Education. Okayama Prefectural University is also located in Sōja.

== Transportation ==
=== Railway ===
JR West (JR West) - Hakubi Line

- Kiyone - Sōja - Gōkei - Hiwa - Minagi

JR West (JR West) - Kibi Line

- Hattori - Higashi-Sōja - Sōja

Ibara Railway Company Ibara Line

- Kiyone - Sōja

=== Highways ===
- Okayama Expressway
- National Route 180
- National Route 429
- National Route 486

== Sister cities ==
Sōja has been twinned with Chino, Nagano in Japan since 1984.

== Local attractions ==
- Kōmorizuka Kofun
- Ki Castle
- Tsukuriyama Kofun
- Bitchū Kokubun-ji ruins
- Fukuyama Castle ruins

== Notable people ==
- Seikaku Takagi, (1923 – 2017) Japanese calligrapher. Recipient of the Prime Minister's Award in Japan.
- Nodoka Harada, softball player
- Gaku Hashimoto, politician
- Hitomi Niiya, long-distance runner
- Satoshi Shimizu, boxer
- Tomohisa Taguchi, anime director
- Mai Yajima, heavy metal singer
