= Okayama Prefectural University =

Higher education institution in Okayama Prefecture, Japan

Coordinates: 34°41′32″N 133°46′55″E

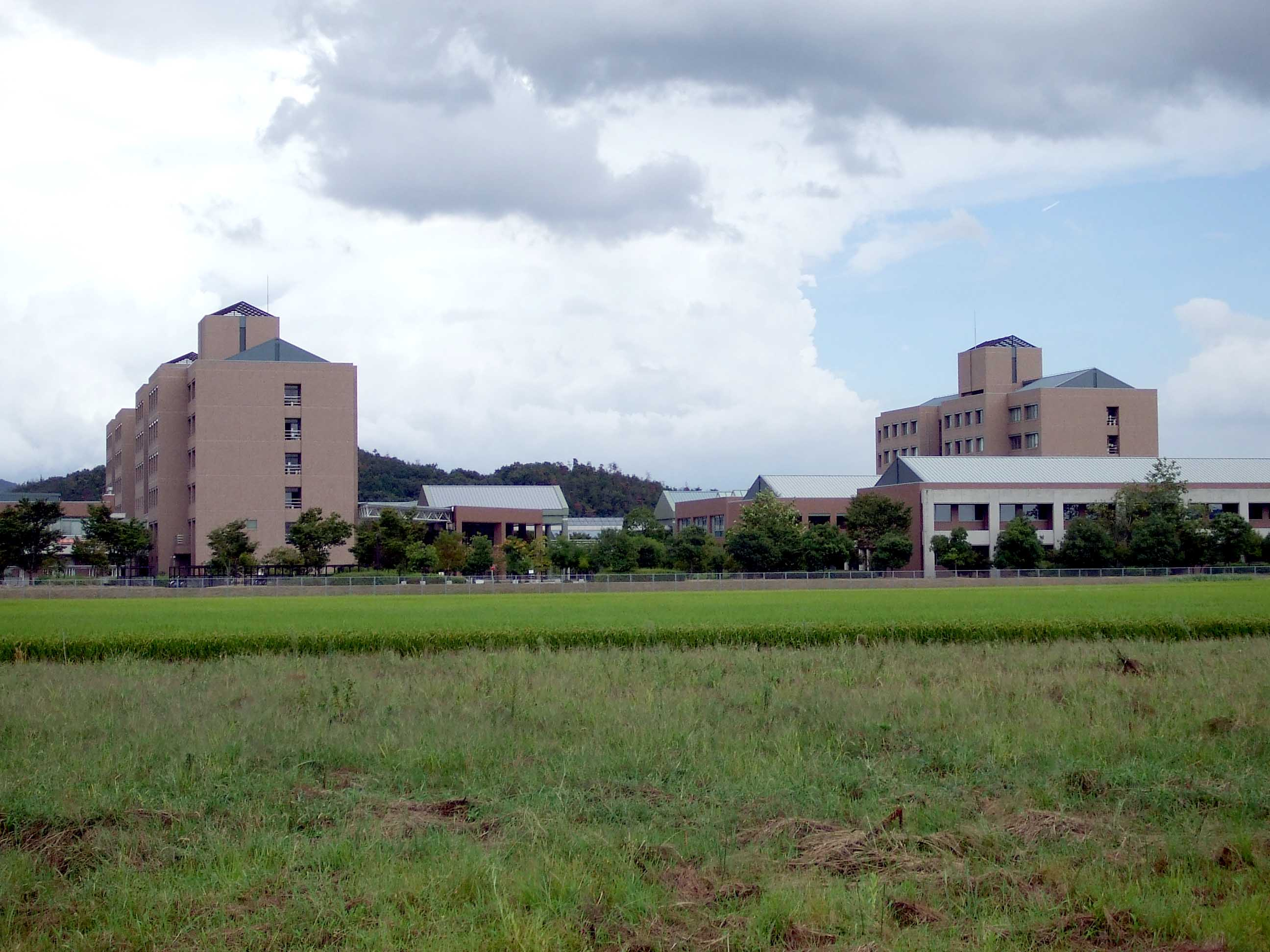
- Okayama Prefectural University
- Type: Public
- Established: 1993
- Affiliations: UCNW, WU, SU, NU
- Chancellor: Nobuo Sannomiya
- Undergraduates: 1,636
- Postgraduates: 220
- Doctoral students: 43
- Location: Sōja, Okayama Prefecture, Japan
- Campus: 0.3 km^{2}
- Website: www.oka-pu.ac.jp/en/index.html

Okayama Prefectural University (岡山県立大学, Okayama Kenritsu Daigaku) is a public university in Sōja, Okayama, Japan, established in 1993.

== Faculties and graduate schools ==
=== Faculties ===
- Faculty of Health and Welfare Science
- Faculty of Computer Science and Systems Engineering
- Faculty of Design

=== Graduate Schools ===
- Graduate School of Health and Welfare Science
- Graduate School of Systems Engineering
- Graduate School of Design

== Campus ==
- Sōja Campus - (111 Kuboki, Sōja)

== See also ==
- List of universities in Japan
