= Yamate, Okayama =

Dissolved municipality in Okayama prefecture, Japan

Yamate (山手村, Yamate-son) was a village located in Tsukubo District, Okayama Prefecture, Japan.

As of 2003, the village had an estimated population of 4,064 and a density of 396.88 persons per km^{2}. The total area was 10.24 km^{2}.

On March 22, 2005, Yamate, along with the village of Kiyone (also from Tsukubo District), was merged into the expanded city of Sōja.
