= Tsukubo District, Okayama =

District in Okayama prefecture, Japan

Coordinates: 34.6105°N 133.8231°E

Location of Tsukubo District in Okayama Prefecture

Tsukubo (都窪郡, Tsukubo-gun) is a district located in Okayama Prefecture, Japan.

As of 2003, the district has an estimated population of 21,601 and a population density of 789.80 persons per km^{2}. The total area is 27.35 km^{2}.

== Towns and villages ==
- Hayashima

== Merger ==
- On March 22, 2005, the villages of Yamate and Kiyone merged into the city of Sōja.
