= Kiyone, Okayama =

Dissolved municipality in Okayama prefecture, Japan

Kiyone (清音村, Kiyone-son) was a village located in Tsukubo District, Okayama Prefecture, Japan.

As of 2003, the village had an estimated population of 5,563 and a density of 585.58 persons per km^{2}. The total area was 9.50 km^{2}.

On March 22, 2005, Kiyone, along with the village of Yamate (also from Tsukubo District), was merged into the expanded city of Sōja.
