= Kingdom of Kibi =

Kingdom of 4th-century western Japan

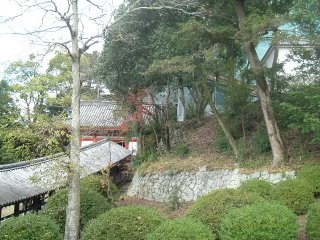
Kibitsu Shrine, which protects Okayama from the demons of Kibi's legends

Kibi (吉備国, Kibi no kuni) was a kingdom located in western Japan that possibly existed during the third and fourth centuries. The Kingdom of Kibi covered most of what is today Okayama Prefecture. Today, the Kibi Road crosses the plain between Okayama and Sōja, what was once the heartland of Kibi no kuni.

== Etymology ==
In modern Japanese, 黍 kibi refers to proso millet (Panicum miliaceum). However, the name of the kingdom of Kibi, which appears in the Kojiki and the Nihon Shoki (the oldest written records in Japan), may have a different origin that has been lost to time. The Chinese characters used for writing the name of the kingdom, which have been in use for over 1200 years, literally mean "lucky, propitious, good" and "to prepare, preparation; ready; complete, perfect; provision, equipment, installation, facility" and probably have been used for their phonetic values.

== History ==
Not much is known about the kingdom of Kibi. According to Michael Gorman, Kibi may have existed around the same time as Yamatai in the third century and the two polities may have been related.

Archaeological research of many temples and shrine ruins, as well as burial mounds, suggests that the ancient kingdom was possibly as developed and powerful as the Yamato administration that controlled Japan in the eighth century. The center of power of the Kibi Kingdom was located on the Kibi plain between Soja and Okayama.

== Legends ==
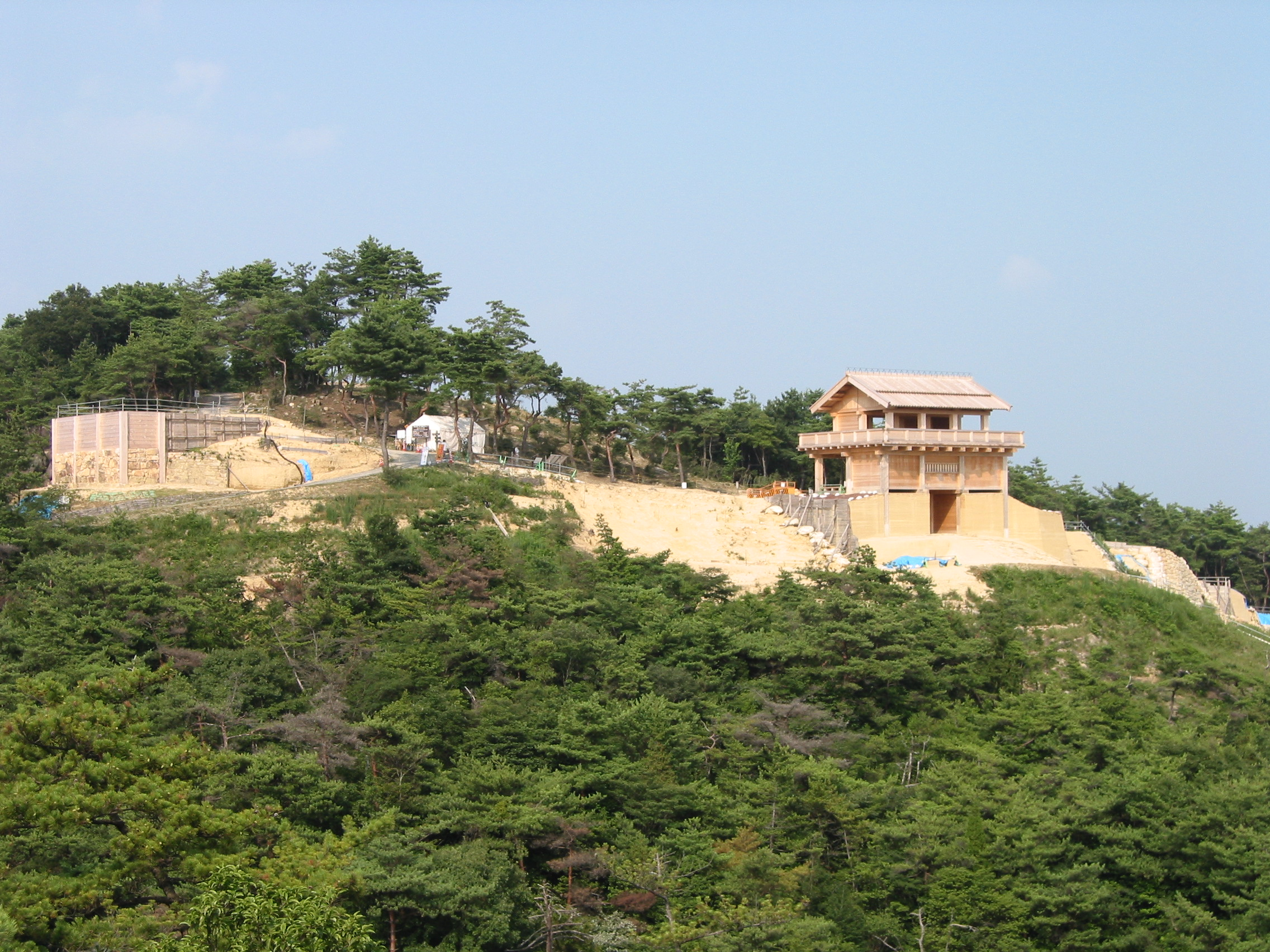
Ki castle

Kibi has also been associated with the legends of Kibitsuhiko-no-mikoto. According to the Nihon Shoki, he was the son of Emperor Kōrei. Legend says this prince slew an ogre called Ura. The tale may be a metaphor for the conquest of the Kingdom of Kibi, which was destroyed during the reign of Emperor Kōrei. In the story, the demon Ura lived in Ki castle, the capital of Kibi.

== See also ==
- Ezo
- Kibi no Makibi
- Kibi Province
- Mount Kibi no Nakayama
