= Okayama =

Okayama 岡山市
- Prefecture capital and Designated city
- Okayama City
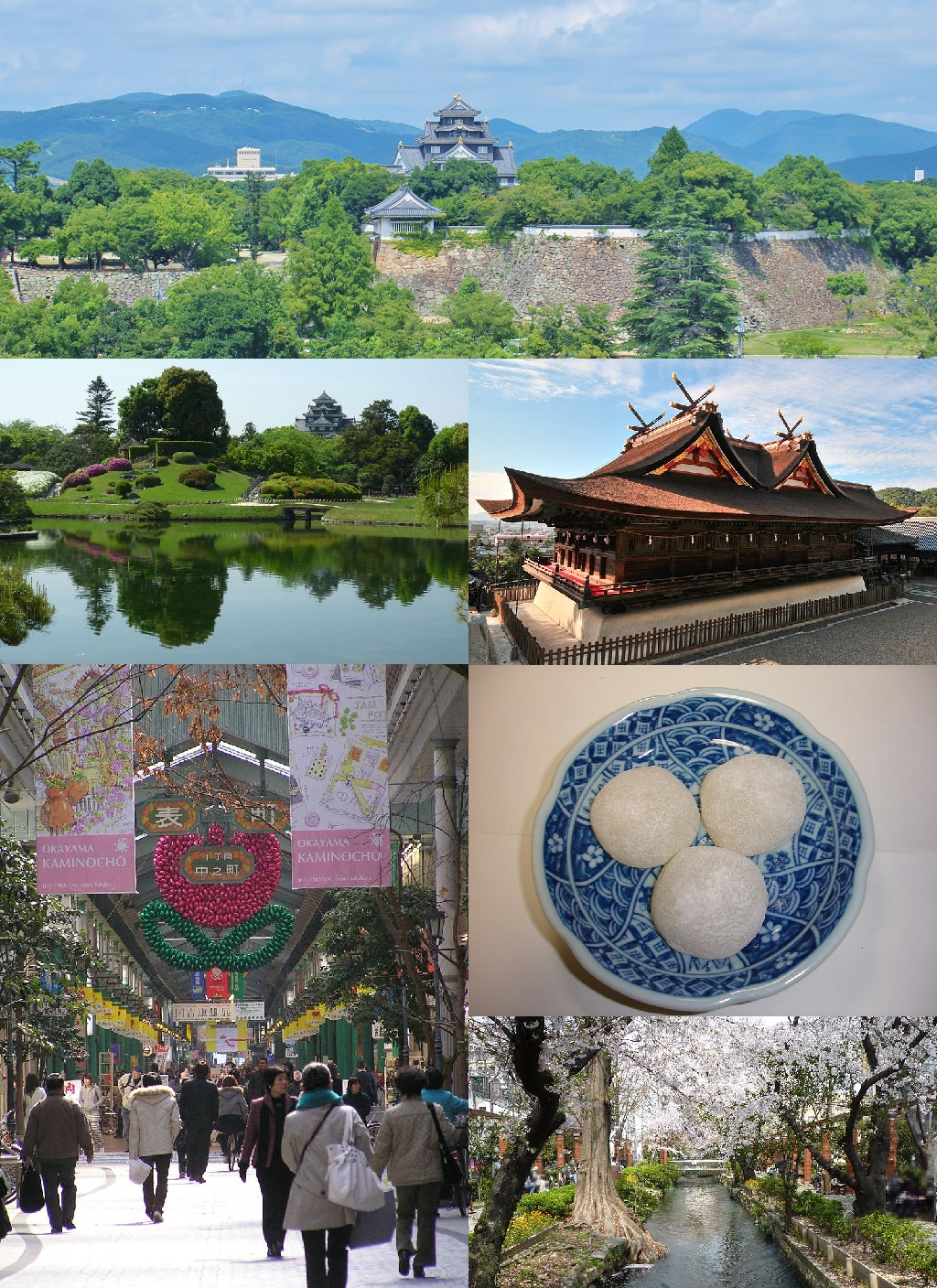
- (From top, left to right : Okayama Castle • Okayama Kōraku-en Garden • Kibitsu Jinja • Kibidango • Omote-chō shopping arcade • Nishigawa Green Park)

- Flag Seal
- Location of Okayama in Okayama Prefecture

- Location in Japan Okayama (Okayama Prefecture)
- Coordinates: 34°39′N 133°55′E
- Country: Japan
- Region: Chūgoku (San'yō)
- Prefecture: Okayama

Government
  - Mayor: Masao Omori

Area
  - Total: 789.95 km^{2} (305.00 sq mi)

Population (February 1, 2023)
  - Total: 700,940
  - Density: 887.32/km^{2} (2,298.2/sq mi)
- Time zone: UTC+09:00 (JST)
- City hall address: 1-1-1 Daitomo, Kita-ku, Okayama-shi, Okayama-ken 700-8544
- Website: Official website
- Symbols
- Bird: Red-crowned crane
- Flower: Chrysanthemum
- Tree: Ilex rotunda; Lagerstroemia indica

Okayama (岡山市, Okayama-shi; English: /ˌoʊk.ə.ˈjɑːm.ə, ˌɒk-/; Japanese: [ò̞.kä́.jä̀.mä̀, -jä́.mä́.ɕì]) is the capital city of Okayama Prefecture in the Chūgoku region of Japan. The Okayama metropolitan area, centered around the city, has the largest urban employment zone in the Chugoku region of western Japan. The city was founded on June 1, 1889. As of February 2023, the city has an estimated population of 700,940 and a population density of 890 people per km^{2}. The total area is 789.95 square kilometres (305.00 square miles).

The city is the site of Kōraku-en, known as one of the top three traditional gardens in Japan, and Okayama Castle, which is ranked among the best 100 Japanese castles. The city is famous as the setting of the Japanese fable Momotarō. Okayama joined the UNESCO Global Network of Learning Cities in 2016.

== History ==
=== Sengoku to Edo period ===
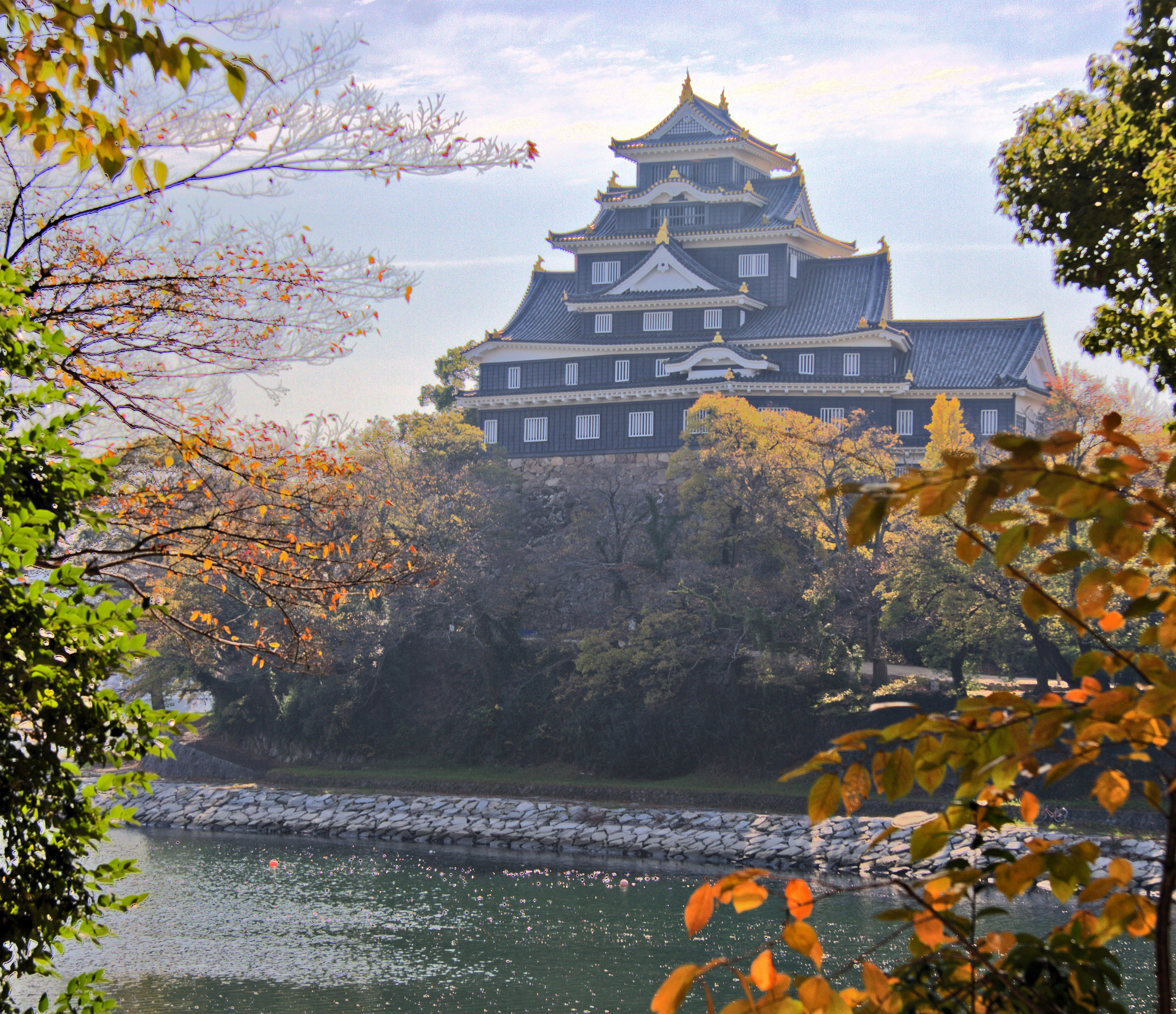
Okayama Castle

In the late 16th century, during the Sengoku period (also called the Warring states period), Ukita Naoie consolidated a stronghold at Ishiyama beside the Asahi River. His successor, Ukita Hideie, shifted the main enclosure to the hill called "Okayama" and completed Okayama Castle, traditionally dated to 1597; hydrological works redirected river channels to serve as moats, and a castle town was laid out on a north–south axis. After the Battle of Sekigahara, Kobayakawa Hideaki became the lord of the Okayama Domain and reconfigured the outer defenses, including the Hatsuka-bori (an outer moat reputedly finished in twenty days) and gates that defined the city's perimeter. Ikeda Tadatugu, who was the feudal lord of Himeji Domain, became the next lord of Okayama. The Ikeda clan subsequently ruled Okayama and expanded the castle town.

=== Meiji period to World War II ===
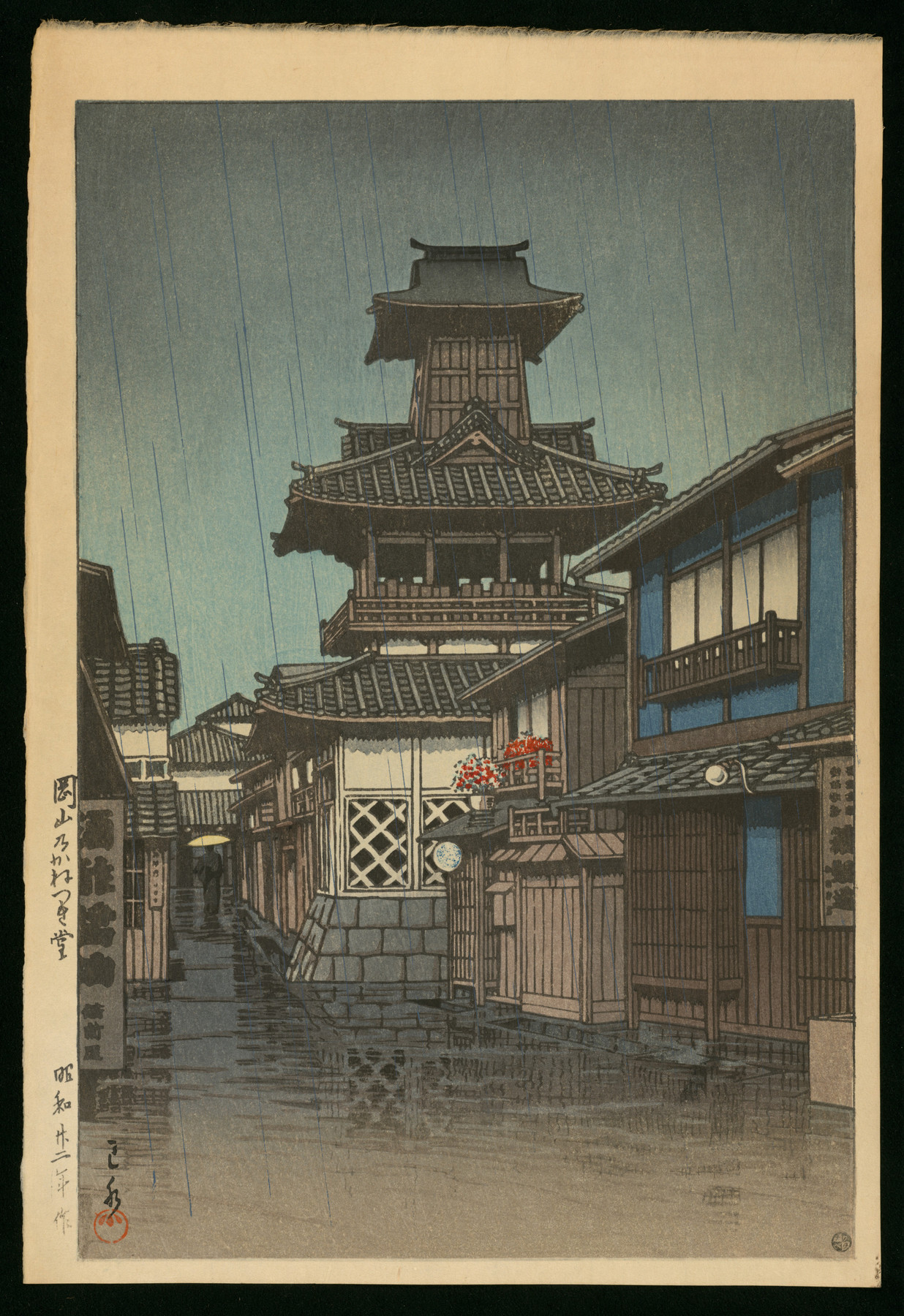
Kawase Hasui, Bell Tower in Rain, Okayama, 1947

On August 29, 1871, the new Meiji government of the Empire of Japan replaced the traditional feudal domain system with centralized government authority. Okayama became the capital of Okayama Prefecture. In 1889, Okayama City was founded with the establishment of the modern municipalities system. In the Meiji period, a San'yo Main Line railroad and other local lines greatly enhanced the development of the city. The Sixth Higher Middle School (第六高等学校, Dairoku Kōtōgakkō) and Okayama Medical College (岡山医科大学, Okayama Ika-daigaku) were established in Okayama City.

With modern state formation, the city developed as a regional hub for transport and education in western Japan.

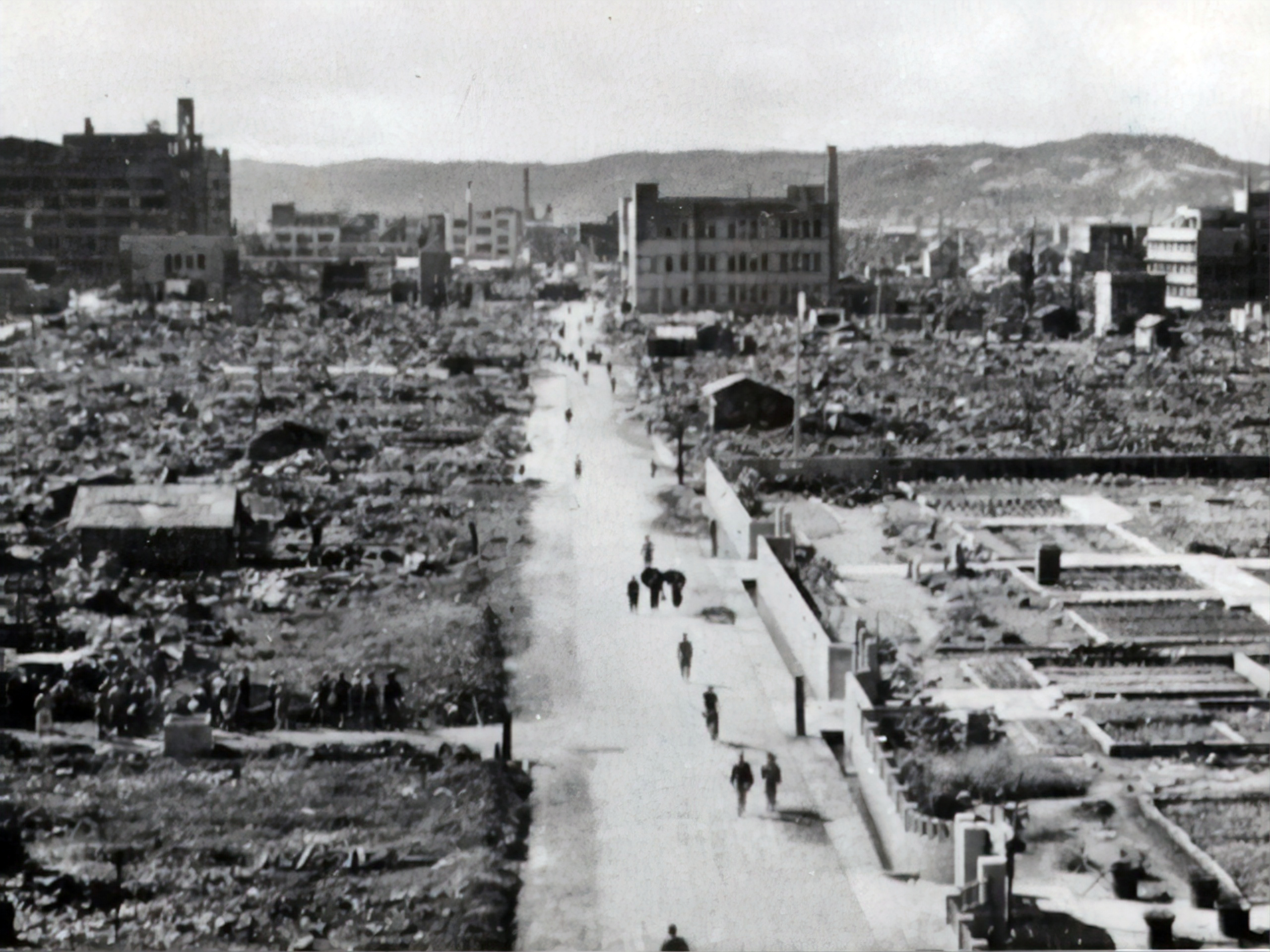
Okayama after World War II

When World War II began, Okayama city was a garrison city for the Imperial Japanese Army. During the war, the city was bombed by the American forces. On 29 June 1945, air raids burned much of the urban core; the castle keep was lost. More than 1700 people were killed.

=== After the war ===
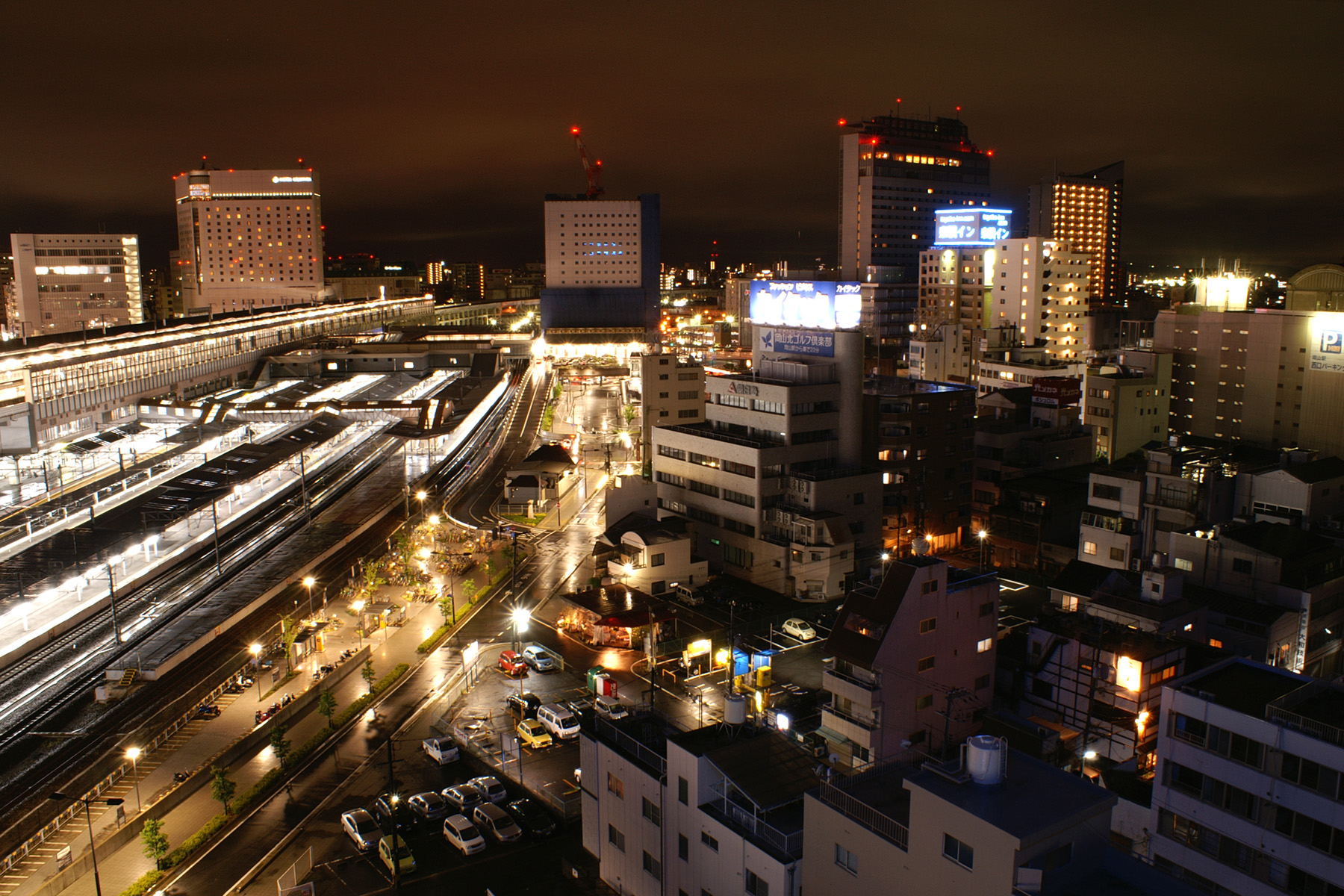
View near Okayama Station

Postwar rebuilding reestablished the central districts on the former castle-town grid. Landmarks of the modern center include the Yanagawa rotary (1959) and large-scale redevelopment in Nakasange continuing into the 21st century. Okayama Castle's keep was reconstructed in 1966, restoring the "Ujō" ("Crow Castle") silhouette above the Asahi River.

During Japan's economic boom of the 1960s, Okayama developed rapidly as one of the most important cities in the Chūgoku and Shikoku regions. In 1972, the San'yō Shinkansen began service between Shin-Ōsaka and Okayama stations. Two years later, Shinkansen service was extended to Hakata. In 1988, the Seto-Ōhashi Bridge was opened, and connected Okayama with Shikoku directly by rail and road.

The city became a core city in 1996 and a designated city on April 1, 2009, with increased local autonomy.

On March 22, 2005, the town of Mitsu (from Mitsu District), and the town of Nadasaki (from Kojima District) were merged into Okayama. This was followed on January 22, 2007, when the town of Takebe (from Mitsu District), and the town of Seto (from Akaiwa District) were merged into Okayama. Kojima, Mitsu, and Akaiwa Districts have all since been dissolved as a result of these mergers.

== Geography ==
The city of Okayama is located in the southern part of Okayama Prefecture, which is located in western part of the island of Honshū. The northern part of the city forms a corner of Kibi Plateau, which is a series of gentle hills, and includes the Asahikawa Dam, Okayama Airport, and a suburban residential area. The central urban area is located on the Okayama Plain in the south, which was formed by the transportation and sedimentation of two first-class rivers, the Asahi River and Yoshii River, which flow into the Seto Inland Sea. To the south of the main urban area is Kojima Bay, which forms the scenic Kojima Peninsula overlooking the Seto Inland Sea.

=== Neighboring municipalities ===
Okayama Prefecture

- Akaiwa
- Bizen
- Hayashima
- Kibichūō
- Kumenan
- Kurashiki
- Misaki
- Setouchi
- Sōja
- Tamano

=== Climate ===
Okayama has a mild climate in comparison to most of Japan. It has the most rain-free days (less than 1mm of precipitation) of any city in Japan. It is ranked as the second driest and the fourth sunniest city in the Chūgoku region. The climate is classified under the Köppen climate classification as humid subtropical (Cfa).

The local climate is warm enough throughout the year to support olive trees. Okayama is often called "Land of Sunshine" because of its low number of rainy days per year.

Climate data for Okayama (1991−2020 normals, extremes 1891−present)
Month	Jan	Feb	Mar	Apr	May	Jun	Jul	Aug	Sep	Oct	Nov	Dec	Year
Record high °C (°F)	18.8 (65.8)	22.3 (72.1)	26.7 (80.1)	29.6 (85.3)	33.6 (92.5)	37.0 (98.6)	38.7 (101.7)	39.5 (103.1)	37.2 (99.0)	33.4 (92.1)	26.9 (80.4)	21.5 (70.7)	39.5 (103.1)
Mean maximum °C (°F)	13.9 (57.0)	16.6 (61.9)	20.9 (69.6)	26.5 (79.7)	30.6 (87.1)	33.3 (91.9)	36.1 (97.0)	36.4 (97.5)	33.5 (92.3)	28.5 (83.3)	22.3 (72.1)	16.6 (61.9)	36.9 (98.4)
Mean daily maximum °C (°F)	9.6 (49.3)	10.5 (50.9)	14.6 (58.3)	19.8 (67.6)	24.8 (76.6)	27.6 (81.7)	31.8 (89.2)	33.3 (91.9)	29.1 (84.4)	23.4 (74.1)	17.1 (62.8)	11.7 (53.1)	21.1 (70.0)
Daily mean °C (°F)	4.6 (40.3)	5.2 (41.4)	8.7 (47.7)	14.1 (57.4)	19.1 (66.4)	22.7 (72.9)	27.0 (80.6)	28.1 (82.6)	23.9 (75.0)	18.0 (64.4)	11.6 (52.9)	6.6 (43.9)	15.8 (60.4)
Mean daily minimum °C (°F)	0.1 (32.2)	0.5 (32.9)	3.5 (38.3)	8.5 (47.3)	14.8 (58.6)	18.7 (65.7)	23.4 (74.1)	24.6 (76.3)	20.0 (68.0)	13.4 (56.1)	6.8 (44.2)	2.1 (35.8)	11.4 (52.5)
Mean minimum °C (°F)	−2.7 (27.1)	−2.3 (27.9)	−0.6 (30.9)	2.7 (36.9)	9.0 (48.2)	14.9 (58.8)	20.3 (68.5)	21.1 (70.0)	15.1 (59.2)	8.3 (46.9)	2.6 (36.7)	−0.9 (30.4)	−3.2 (26.2)
Record low °C (°F)	−8.9 (16.0)	−9.1 (15.6)	−7.0 (19.4)	−3.6 (25.5)	1.0 (33.8)	7.4 (45.3)	12.6 (54.7)	14.8 (58.6)	7.2 (45.0)	1.7 (35.1)	−3.5 (25.7)	−6.5 (20.3)	−9.1 (15.6)
Average precipitation mm (inches)	36.2 (1.43)	45.4 (1.79)	82.5 (3.25)	90.0 (3.54)	112.6 (4.43)	169.3 (6.67)	177.4 (6.98)	97.2 (3.83)	142.2 (5.60)	95.4 (3.76)	53.3 (2.10)	41.5 (1.63)	1,143.1 (45.00)
Average snowfall cm (inches)	0 (0)	1 (0.4)	0 (0)	0 (0)	0 (0)	0 (0)	0 (0)	0 (0)	0 (0)	0 (0)	0 (0)	0 (0)	1 (0.4)
Average precipitation days (≥ 0.5 mm)	5.4	6.9	9.2	9.6	9.4	11.6	10.9	7.7	9.7	7.7	6.4	6.3	100.8
Average relative humidity (%)	69	66	65	60	64	71	74	69	71	71	72	71	69
Mean monthly sunshine hours	149.0	145.4	177.8	192.6	205.9	153.5	169.8	203.2	157.5	171.5	153.7	153.8	2,033.7
Source: Japan Meteorological Agency

== Demographics ==
Per Japanese census data, the population of Okayama is as follows:

Historical population
Year	Pop.	±% p.a.
1960	432,177	—
1970	500,599	+1.48%
1980	590,424	+1.66%
1990	640,406	+0.82%
2000	674,375	+0.52%
2010	709,622	+0.51%
2020	724,691	+0.21%

== Government ==
Okayama has a mayor-council form of government with a directly elected mayor and a unicameral city legislature of 46 members. The city contributes 19 members to the Okayama Prefectural Assembly. In terms of national politics, the city is divided between of the Okayama 1st District, Okayama 2nd District and Okayama 3rd District of the lower house of the Diet of Japan.

=== Local administration ===
Since Okayama became a designated city in 2009, the city has been divided into four wards (ku).

Ward	Population	Area (km^{2})	Density (per km^{2})	Map
Kita-ku (northern ward)	302,685	451.03	671	
Naka-ku (central ward)	142,237	51.24	2,776	
Higashi-ku (eastern ward)	96,948	160.28	605	
Minami-ku (southern ward)	167,714	127.36	1,317	
Population as of October 1, 2010

== Economy ==
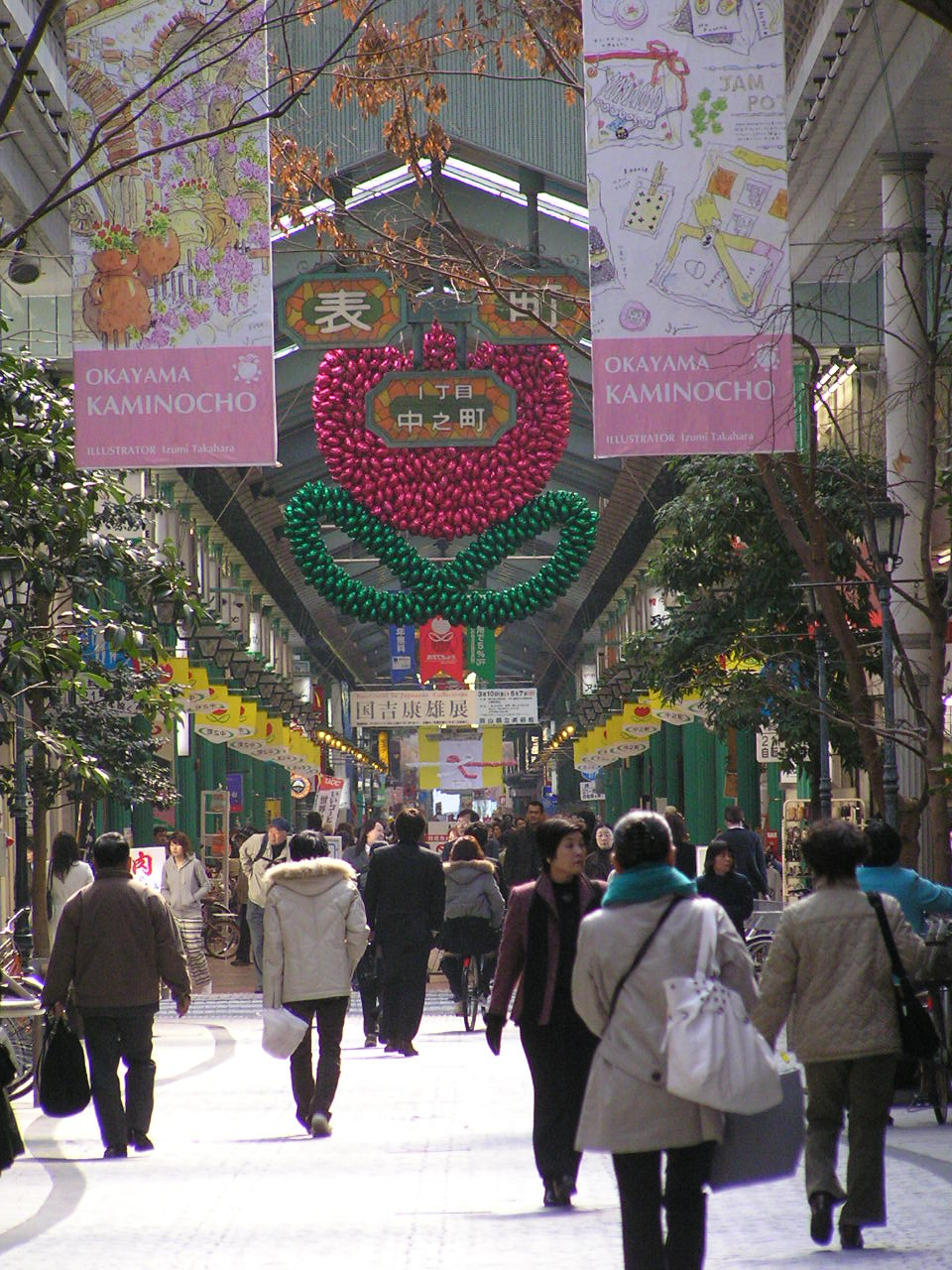
Omotechō Shopping Street

A map showing Okayama Metropolitan Employment Area.

=== Agriculture ===
The city is located in the Okayama Plain, where rice, eggplant, and white Chinese chives are notable products. White peaches and grapes are cultivated in the mountainous, northern part of the city.

=== Industry ===
In 2005, the city's gross domestic product was 800 billion yen, nearly 10% of the GDP of Okayama Prefecture.

Greater Okayama, Okayama Metropolitan Employment Area, has a GDP of US$63.1 billion as of 2010. The main industries are machine tools, chemicals, foodstuffs and printing. Kōnan, a district in the southern part of the city, is the most developed industrial zone.

=== Commerce ===
Okayama is the core of the Okayama metropolitan area, which includes the cities of Kurashiki and Sōja. The main commercial district is Omotechō, near Okayama Castle and Kōraku-en, and the area surrounding Okayama Station. Omotechō has many covered shopping arcades.

The headquarters of Aeon Corporation, a private English language school with more than 3,000 employees, is located in Okayama.

== Education ==
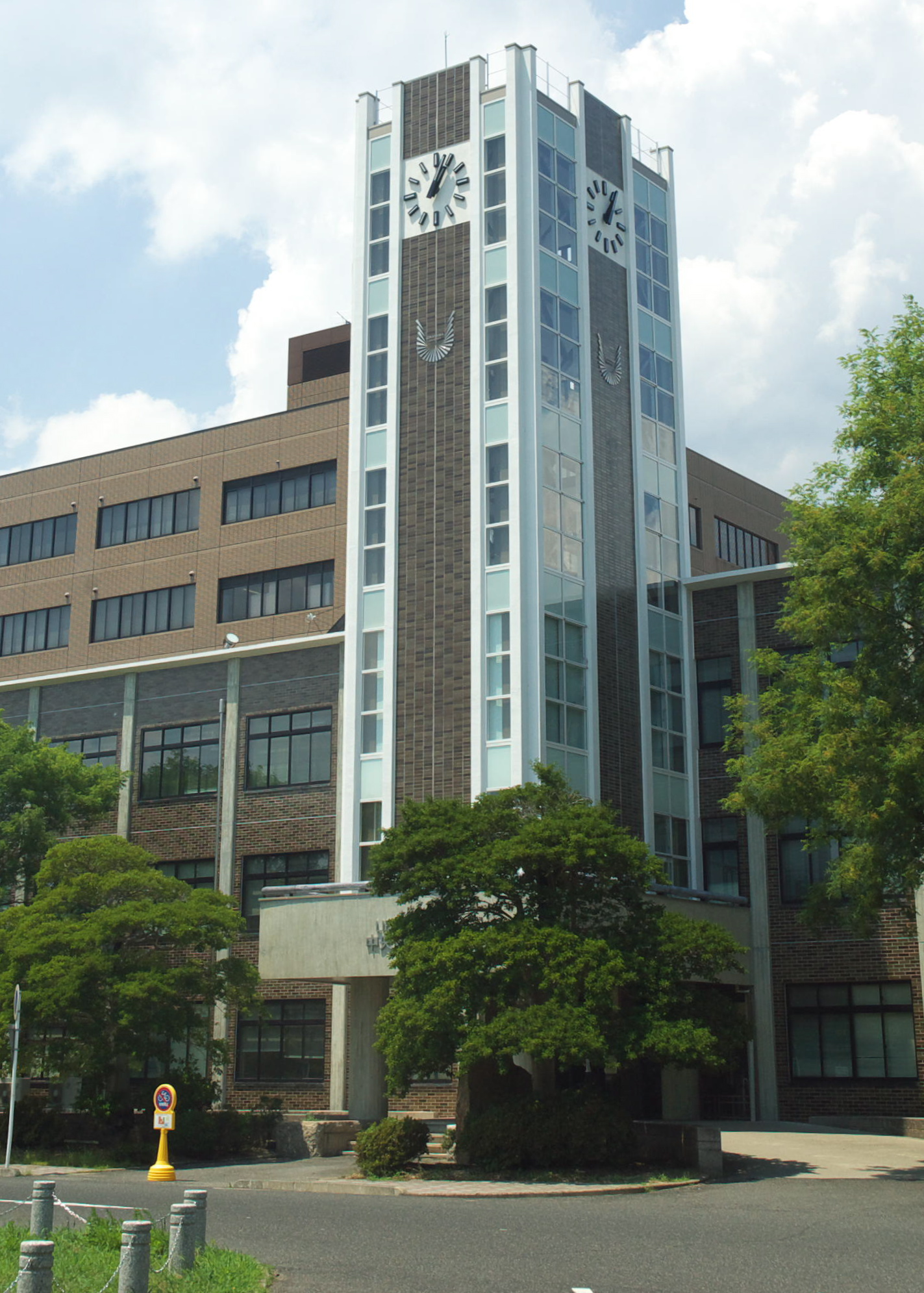
Okayama University

Okayama University, founded as a medical school in 1870 and established in 1949 as a national university, is in the city. Today, Okayama University is Okayama's largest university, with 8 faculties and seven graduate schools.

There are seven private universities, three junior colleges, 24 high schools (16 public, eight private), seven combined junior high/high schools (two public, five private), 38 junior high schools (37 municipal, one national) and 93 elementary schools (91 municipal, two private) in the city.

=== Universities ===
- Chugoku Gakuen University (private)
- International Pacific University (private)
- Notre Dame Seishin University (private)
- Okayama Healthcare Professional University (private)
- Okayama Shoka University (private)
- Okayama University (national)
- Okayama University of Science (private)
- Sanyo Gakuen University (private)
- Shujitsu University (private)

== Transportation ==
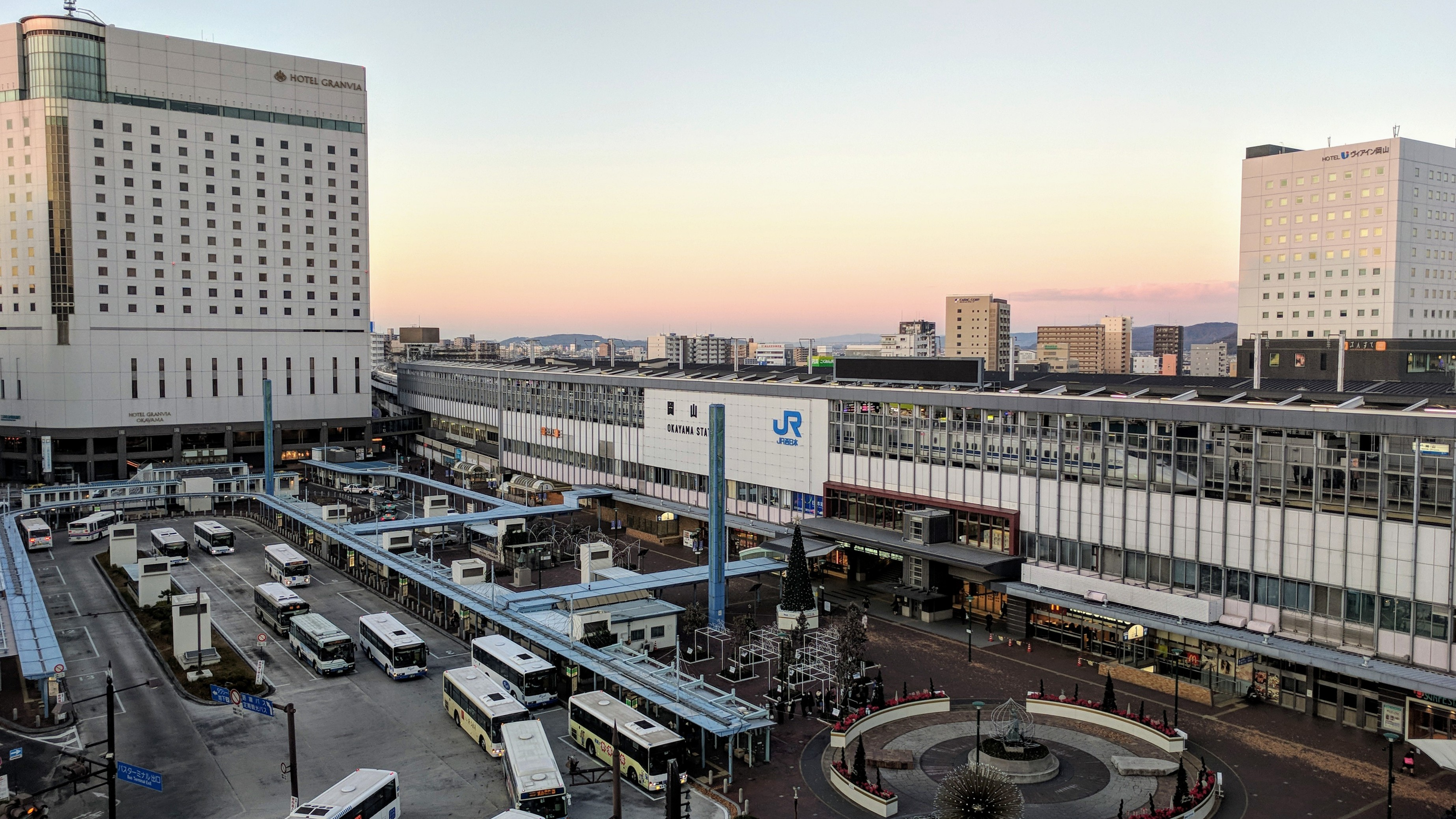
JR West Okayama Station

=== Airports ===
- Okayama Airport, located in the northern part of the city, provides both domestic and limited international services
- Kōnan Airport, located to the south, has been a general aviation airport since the opening of Okayama Airport in 1988.

=== Railway ===
JR West's Okayama Station is a major interchange, with trains from Shikoku, Sanin and San'yo connecting to the San'yō Shinkansen. Local rail lines serving Okayama Station include:

JR West – San'yō Shinkansen

- Okayama

JR West – San'yō Main Line

- Mantomi – Seto – Joto – Higashi-Okayama – Takashima – Nishigawara – Okayama – Kitanagase – Niwase

JR West – Akō Line

- Saidaiji – Odara – Higashi-Okayama

JR West – Uno Line

- Okayama – Omoto – Bizen-Nishiichi – Senoo – Bitchū-Mishima – (Hayashima Town - Kurashiki City) – Hikosaki – Bizen-Kataoka – Hazakawa

JR West – Seto-Ōhashi Line

- Uematsu

JR West – Tsuyama Line

- Okayama – Hōkaiin – Bizen-Hara – Tamagashi – Makiyama – Nonokuchi – Kanagawa – Takebe – Fukuwatari

JR West – Kibi Line

- Okayama – Bizen-Mikado – Daianji – Bizen-Ichinomiya – Kibitsu – Bitchū-Takamatsu – Ashimori

=== Tramway ===
Okayama has kept an operational tram system since the Meiji period. It is managed by Okayama Electric Tramway and offers two lines: the Higashiyama Main Line and the Seikibashi Line.

=== Bus ===
Seven bus companies provide service within the city limits: Bihoku Bus (備北バス), Chūtetsu Bus (中鉄バス), Okaden Bus (岡電バス), Ryōbi Bus (両備バス), Shimoden Bus (下電バス), Tōbi Bus (東備バス), and Uno Bus (宇野バス).

== Sister cities ==
Okayama is twinned with:

- San Jose, California, United States (established on May 26, 1957)
- San José, Costa Rica (established on January 27, 1969)
- Plovdiv, Bulgaria (established on April 28, 1972)
- San Antonio, Texas, United States (established on April 12, 1976)
- Luoyang, China (established on April 6, 1981)
- Bucheon, Gyeonggi-do, South Korea (friendship city since 2002)
- Hsinchu, Taiwan (friendship city since 2003)

== Media ==
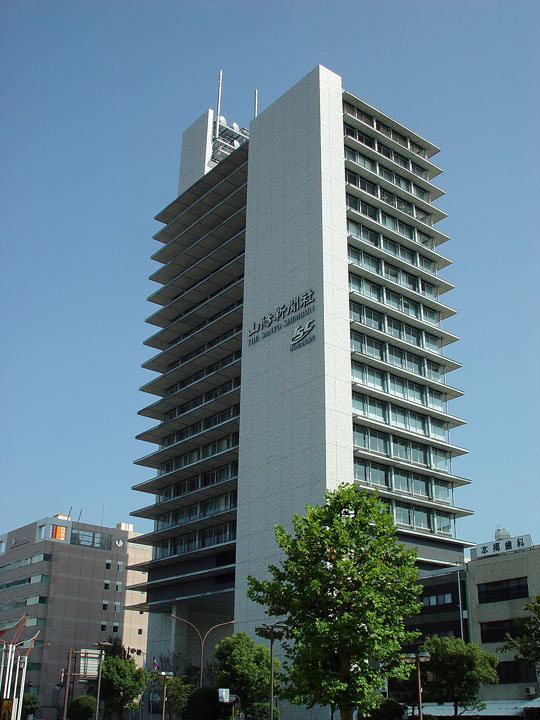
Headquarters of the Sanyo Shimbun and TV Setouchi

The Sanyo Shimbun is the local newspaper serving the greater Okayama area. There are six television stations serving the Okayama area and part of Kagawa Prefecture. Three FM and three AM radio stations also serve the region.

TV stations

Channel ID	Name	Network	Established year	Call sign
1	NHK General TV Okayama	NHK General TV	1957	JOKK-DTV
2	NHK Educational TV Okayama	NHK Educational TV	1963	JOKB-DTV
4	Nishinippon Broadcasting Co., Ltd.(RNC)	NNN	1958	JOKF-DTV
5	Setonaikai Broadcasting Co., Ltd.(KSB)	ANN	1969	JOVH-DTV
6	Sanyo Broadcasting Co., Ltd.(RSK)	JNN	1958	JOYR-DTV
7	TV Setouchi Broadcasting Co., Ltd.(TSC)	TXN	1985	JOPH-DTV
8	Okayama Broadcasting Co., Ltd.(OHK)	FNN	1969	JOOH-DTV

Radio stations

Channel	Name	Network	Established year	Call sign
AM 603 kHz	NHK Radio Daiichi Okayama	NHK Radio Daiichi	1931	JOKK
AM 1386 kHz	NHK Radio Daini Okayama	NHK Radio Daini	1946	JOKB
AM 1494 kHz	Sanyo Broadcasting Co, Ltd.Radio (RSK)	JRN, NRN	1958	JOYR
FM 88.7 MHz	NHK FM Okayama	NHK FM	1964	JOKK-FM
FM 76.8 MHz	FM Okayama	JFN	1999	JOVV-FM
FM 79.0 MHz	Radio MOMO (Okayama City FM)	J-WAVE	1997	JOZZ8AD-FM

== Sports ==
Okayama has many sports teams. In recent years, volleyball team Okayama Seagulls and football club Fagiano Okayama have been established. In 2009, Fagiano Okayama gained promotion to the J.League, the highest football league in Japan. Okayama General and Cultural Gymnasium (岡山市総合文化体育館, Okayama-shi Sōgō Bunka Taiikukan), or Culture Park (カルチャーパーク), is an indoor sporting arena located in Okayama. The capacity of the arena is 8,000 people and was opened in 1982. It hosted some of the group games for the 2003 FIVB Volleyball Men's World Cup.

Club	Sport	League	Venue	Established
Fagiano Okayama	Football	J1 League	City Light Stadium (Okayama Prefectural Multipurpose Athletic Stadium)	2004
Okayama Seagulls	Volleyball	V.League	Momotaro Arena (Okayama Prefectural Multipurpose Grounds Gym)	1999
Okayama Standing Bears	American football	X-League	Kanko Stadium (Okayama Prefectural Multipurpose Athletic Stadium)	?
Citylight Okayama Baseball Team	Baseball	Semi-professional baseball		2008

== Local attractions ==
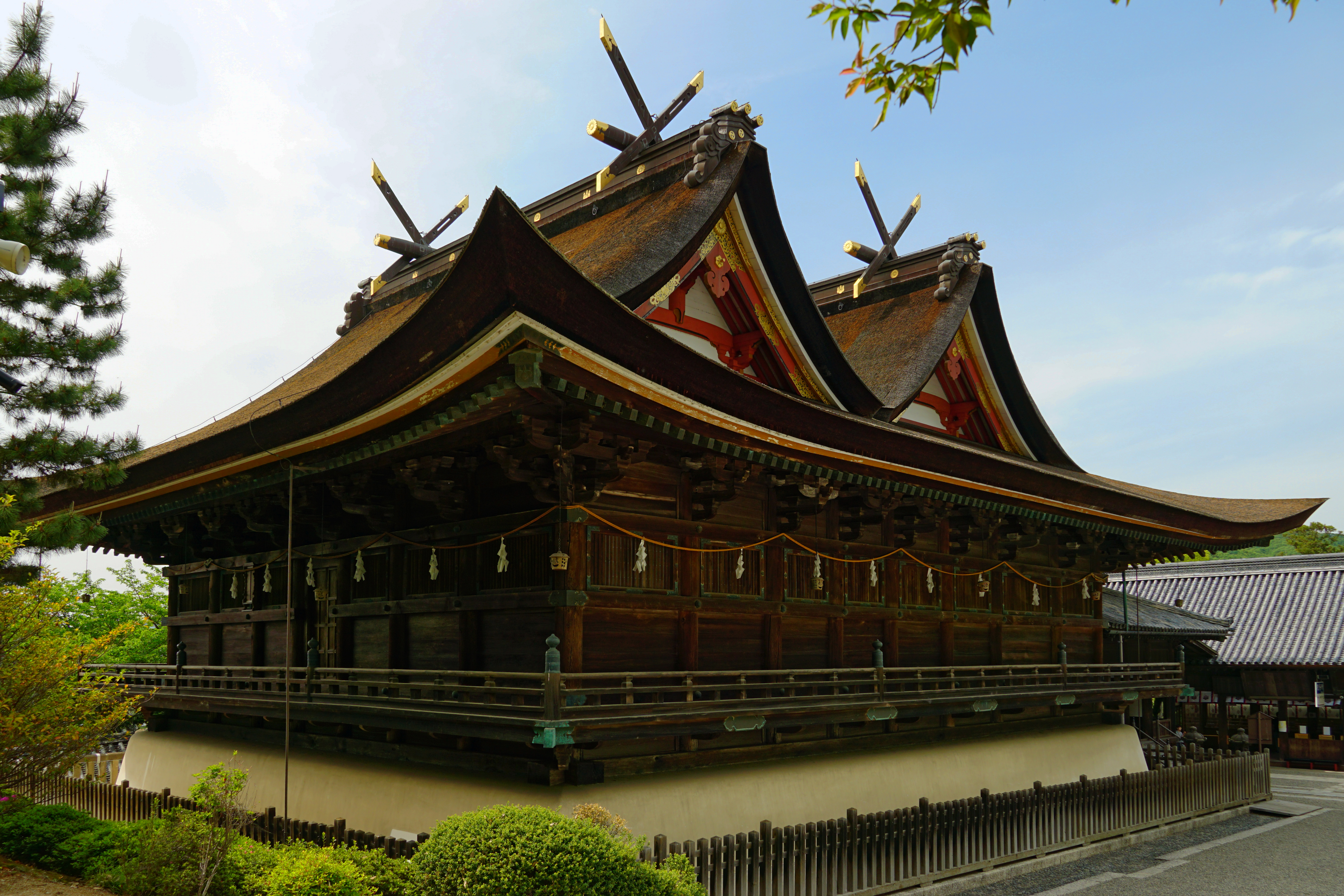
Kibitsu Shrine

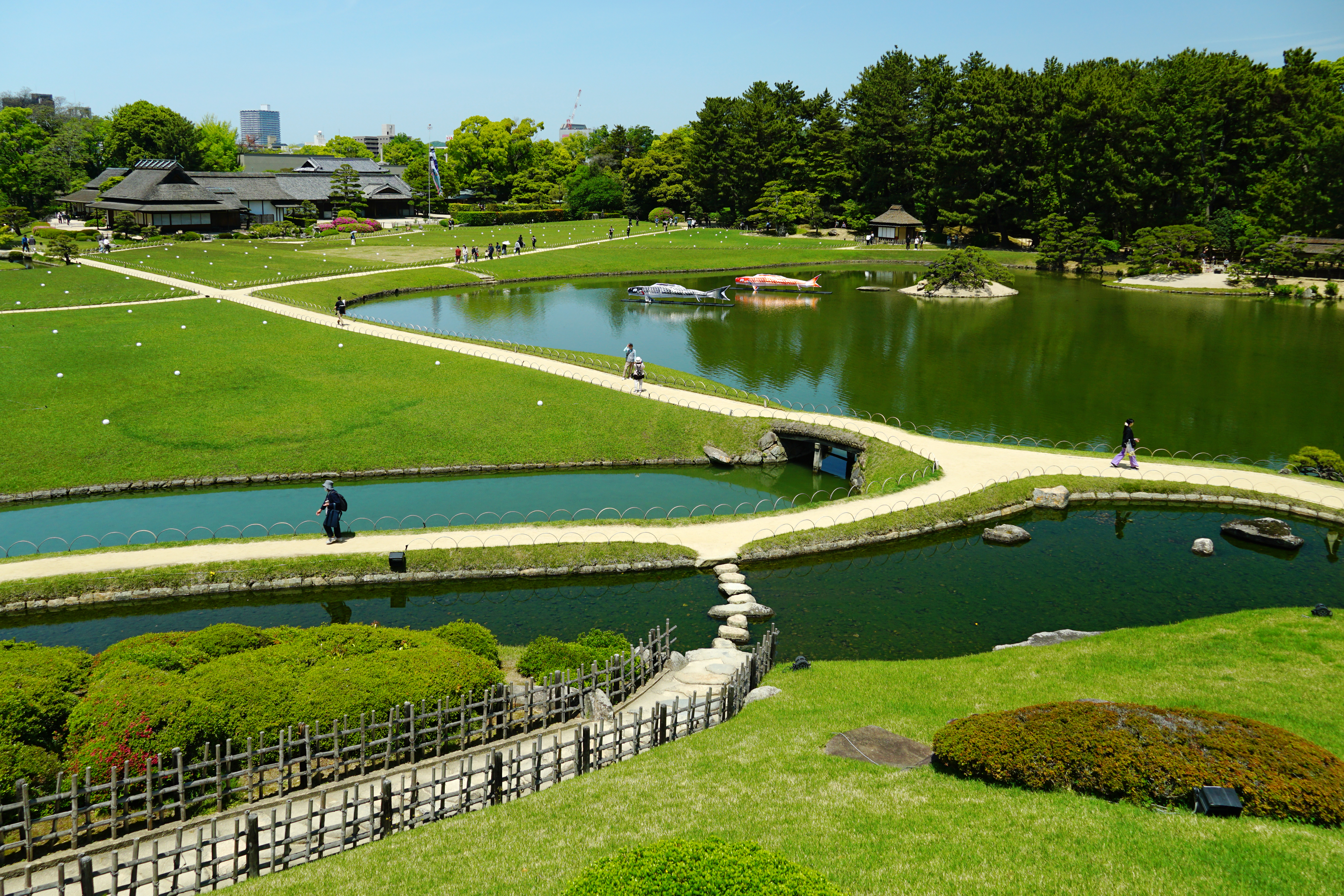
Kōraku-en

- Handayama Botanical Garden
- Hayashibara Museum of Art
- Kibitsuhiko Shrine
- Kibitsu Shrine
- Kōraku-en, known as one of the three best traditional gardens in Japan, lies south of the castle grounds. Kōrakuen was constructed by Ikeda Tsunamasa over 14 years, and completed in 1700.
- Mount Kibi no Nakayama
- Okayama Castle, constructed in 1597. It was destroyed by bombing in 1945 during World War II but reconstructed in 1966.
- Okayama Prefectural Museum
- Okayama Prefectural Museum of Art
- Okayama Orient Museum
- Okayama Symphony Hall
- Yumeji Art Museum

=== National Historic Sites ===
- Bitchū-Takamatsu Castle
- Hata temple ruins Pagoda Site
- Hikozaki Shell Mound
- Jingūjiyama Kofun
- Magane Ichirizuka
- Mantomi Tōdai-ji Tile Kiln Site
- Musa Ōtsuka Kofun
- Ōdara Yosemiya ruins
- Okayama Castle
- Okayama Domain Ikeda clan cemetery
- Former Okayama Domain Han School
- Ōmeguri-Komeguri Mountain Castle ruins
- Onoe Kurumayama Kofun
- Shōda temple ruins
- Sōzume Tō
- Tsukuriyama Kofun
- Tsushima Site
- Urama Chausuyama Kofun

=== Festivals ===
Every August since 1994, Okayama has seen the Momotarō Matsuri (Festival), which is an amalgam of three different festivals, including the Uraja 'ogre' festival, which is a kind of Yosakoi dance.

=== Music ===
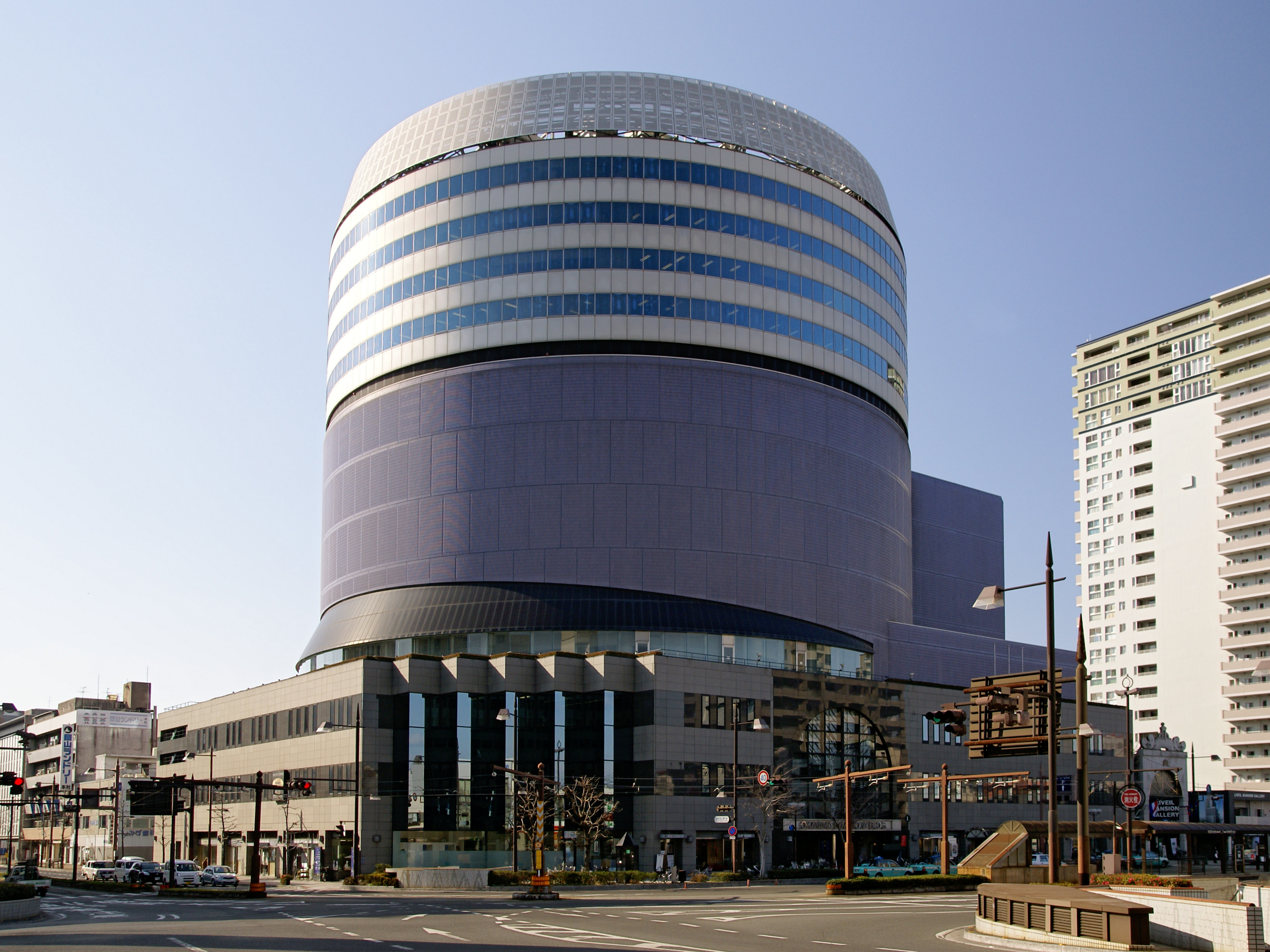
Okayama Symphony Hall

- Okayama Symphony Orchestra, performs at the Okayama Symphony Hall.
- Inryō-ji, a Buddhist temple near the city centre, regularly hosts concerts.

=== Cuisine ===
Okayama has several traditional dishes. Barazushi, a dish made with sushi rice, contains fresh fish from the Seto Inland Sea. Kibi dango (Okayama) (吉備団子) gel-like balls made from a powder of millet and rice, are well known sweets from the area.

== Notable people ==
Premodern

- Eisai (Buddhist priest, 1141–1215)
- Kōan Ogata (Rangaku practitioner, 1810–1863)
- Hideie Ukita (Military commander, 1573–1655)

Arts

- Takashi Fukutani (manga artist, 1952–2000)
- Masashi Kishimoto (manga artist, 1974– )
- Seishi Kishimoto (manga artist, 1974– )
- Shigeru Nanba (painter, 1944– )

Politics

- Ichirō Aisawa (Member of the House of Representatives, 1954– )
- Kenji Eda (Member of the House of Representatives, Secretary General of Your Party, 1956– )
- Satsuki Eda (Member of the House of Councillors, 27th President of the House of Councillors, 1941– )
- Seiji Hagiwara (31st, 32nd Mayor of Okayama, member of the House of Representatives, fourth Mayor of Mimasaka, Okayama, 1956– )
- Tsuyoshi Inukai (Member of the House of Representatives, 29th Prime Minister of Japan, 1855–1932)
- Masahiro Ishii (5th Governor of Okayama Prefecture, Member of the House of Councillors, 1945– )
- Yoshihiro Katayama (Governor of Tottori Prefecture, Minister of Internal Affairs and Communications, 1951– )
- Akihiko Kumashiro (Member of the House of Representatives, 1940– )
- Shigeo Takaya (33rd, 34th Mayor of Okayama, 1937– )
- Keisuke Tsumura (Member of the House of Representatives, 1971– )
- Michiyoshi Yunoki (Member of the House of Representatives, 1972– )

Literature

- Suiin Emi (novelist, 1869–1934)
- Yōko Ogawa (novelist, 1962– )
- Hyakken Uchida (novelist, 1889–1971)
- Junnosuke Yoshiyuki (novelist, 1924–1994)

Entertainment

- Angela Aki (singer-songwriter, 1977– ) (attended middle school in Okayama)
- Fujii Kaze (singer-songwriter, born June 14, 1997)
- Hiroto Kōmoto (musician, 1963– )
- MISA (bassist for Band-Maid - October 15)
- Shinji Morisue (former artistic gymnast and TV personality, 1957– )
- Riki Nishimura (member of the K-pop boy group Enhypen, born 2005)
- Miku Nishizaki (member of Ocha Norma, born 2006)
- Matsunosuke Onoe (actor and film director, 1875–1926)
- Etsuko Shihomi (actress, 1955– )
- Yukiko Takaguchi (voice actor, 1974– )
- Tomu Uchida (film director, 1898–1970)

Sports

- Noboru Akiyama (baseball player and coach, 1934–2000)
- Yuko Arimori (athlete, 1966– )
- Naoko Hashimoto (volleyball player, 1984– )
- Shigeaki Hattori (racing driver and team owner, 1963–2025)
- Kinue Hitomi (athlete, 1907–1931)
- Tsunenohana Kan'ichi (sumo Yokozuna, b. 1896)
- Masahiro Kawai (baseball player, 1964– )
- Issei Morita (baseball player, 1989– )
- Maurice Ndour (born 1992) (Senegalese basketball player for Hapoel Jerusalem of the Israeli Basketball Premier League)
- Hikaru Sato (wrestler and mixed martial artist, 1980– )
- Hinako Shibuno (golfer, 1998– )
- Kiyoshi Tamura (wrestler, 1969– )
- Hisashi Tsuchida (soccer player, 1967– )

Inventors

- Seiichi Miyake (inventor of tactile paving, 1926–1982)
