= Mantomi Tōdai-ji Tile Kiln Site =

Archaeological site in Japan

Mantomi Tōdai-ji Tile Kiln ruins
- 伊良湖東大寺瓦窯跡 (Japanese)
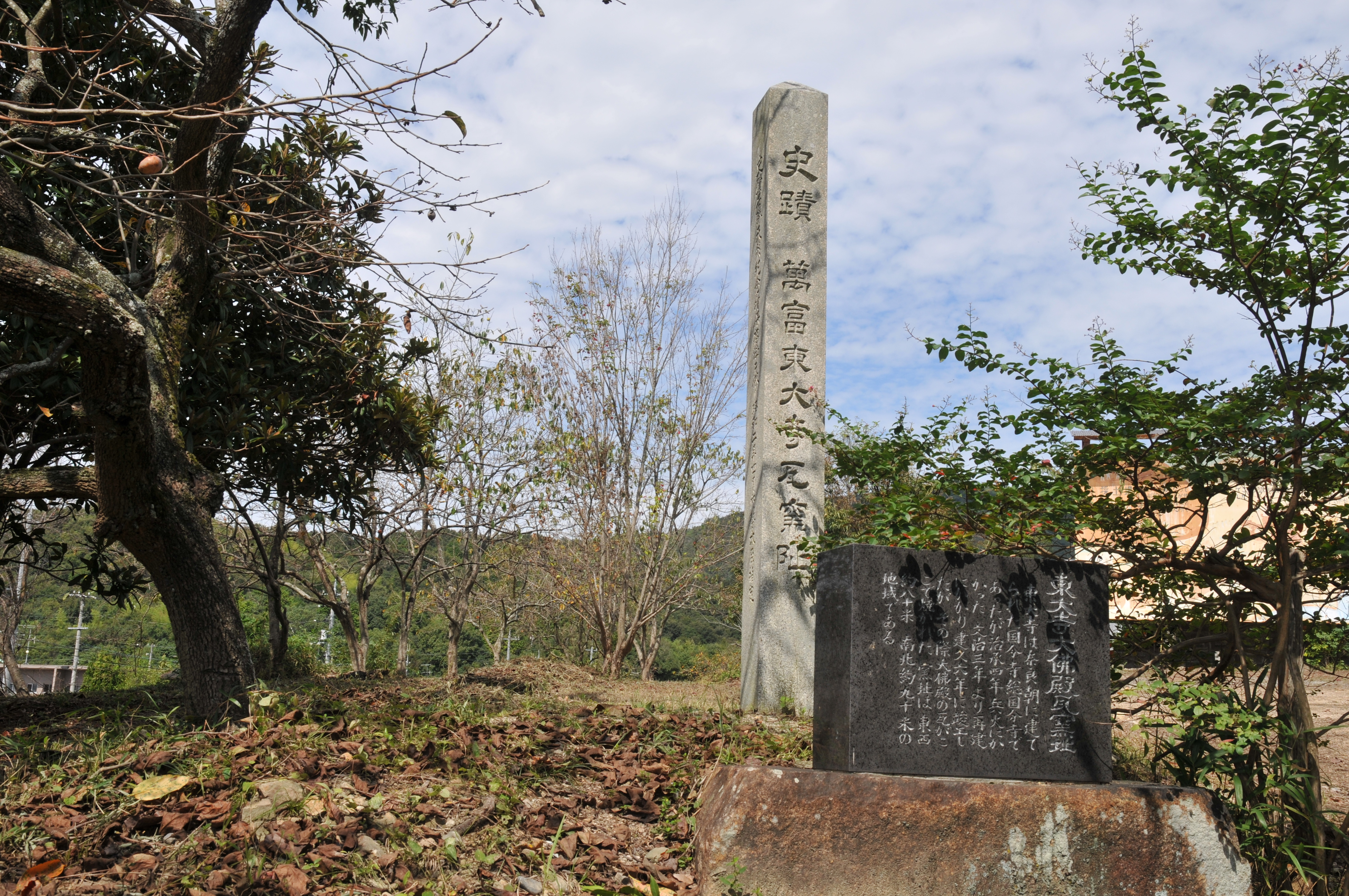
- Irago Tōdai-ji Tile Kiln ruins

- Mantomi Tōdai-ji Tile Kiln ruins Mantomi Tōdai-ji Tile Kiln Site (Japan)
- 34°45′43.2″N 134°4′43.7″E
- Type: kiln ruins
- Periods: Kamakura period
- Location: Higashi-ku, Okayama, Japan
- Region: San'yō region

Site notes
- Public access: Yes (no public facilities)
- National Historic Site of Japan

The Mantomi Tōdai-ji Tile Kiln ruins (万富東大寺瓦窯跡, Mantomi Tōdaiji kawara gama ato) is an archaeological site containing the remnants of a number of anagama kilns, from which the roof tiles for the Kamakura period reconstruction of the temple of Tōdai-ji in Nara were made. The site is located in the Seto neighborhood in Higashi-ku in the city of Okayama, Okayama Prefecture in the San'yō region of Japan. It was designated a National Historic Site of Japan in 1927, with the area under protection expanded in 2004.

== Overview ==
In 1180 AD, during the Genpei War of the late Heian period, the great temple of Tōdai-ji was burned down by Heike forces. The temple was rebuilt by the Kamakura shogunate in 1195 AD. The monk Shunjōbō Chōgen, with the support of the Imperial Court, was appointed as a daikan to collect the funds for the project, and was given the revenues of all Bizen Province to use for the reconstruction.

The Mantomi Tōdai-ji Tile Kiln ruins are located about 400 meters north of Mantomi Station on the JR West San'yō Main Line, on the western slope of a long, narrow hill. The area is rich in high-quality clay and the Yoshii River is easily accessible to allow access by boat from the Seto Inland Sea. The site has been known to have a connection with Tōdai-ji for many years, as roof tiles bearing the stamp of "Tōdai-ji" have been recovered from the area. According to local legend, the site was originally a Hachiman shrine, but the location of the shrine was turned into a pond due to the amount of clay excavated. Archaeological excavations from 1979 by the Okayama Prefectural Board of Education found the ruins of 13 kilns in a line from north to south on the western slope of the Oterayama area sloping from east to west. The structure of the kiln was a flat kiln with a rostle to improve the passage of the flame. These kilns produced mainly flat tiles, but also eaves tiles which were marked with the inscription "Tōdai-ji Daibutsuden" in kanji centered on a Siddhaṃ script character. It is estimated that between 300,000 and 400,000 roof tiles for Tōdai-ji were produced at this kiln. However, the roof tiles produced here were used not only at Tōdai-ji but also at various temples in Okayama Prefecture, and it is speculated that these temples were closely related to Chōgen.

From 2002 to 2004, the former Seto Town Board of Education (currently the Okayama City Board of Education) surveyed the Ueyama Hills to the north of the designated historic site and to the west of the Oterayama Hills, and discovered building foundation stones, pit remains, culvert drainage facilities, and a pottery kiln site for manufacturing miscellaneous household items such as earthenware pots and bowls.

== See also ==
- List of Historic Sites of Japan (Okayama)
- Irago Tōdai-ji Tile Kiln ruins
