= Urama Chausuyama Kofun =

Kofun period burial mound in Higashi-ku, Okayama, Japan

- 浦間茶臼山古墳 (Japanese)
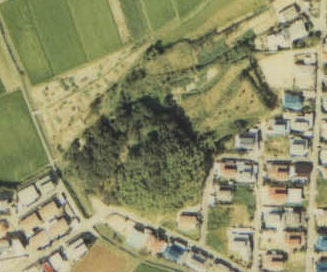
- Aerial photo of Urama Chausuyama Kofun in 1980

- Urama Chausuyama Kofun Urama Chausuyama Kofun (Japan)
- Interactive map of Urama Chausuyama Kofun
- 34°42′36.2″N 134°4′1.3″E
- Type: Kofun
- Periods: Kofun period
- Location: Higashi-ku, Okayama, Okayama Prefecture, Japan
- Region: San'yō region

History
- Built: mid 3rd century

Site notes
- Public access: Yes (no facilities)

Urama Chausuyama Kofun (浦間茶臼山古墳) is a Kofun period burial mound located in the Urama neighborhood of Higashi-ku, Okayama, Okayama Prefecture, in the San'yō region of Japan. The tumulus was designated a National Historic Site of Japan in 1974. It is believed to have been built at the end of the 3rd century in the early Kofun period. It is one of the oldest large keyhole-shaped burial mounds in ancient Kingdom of Kibi.

== Overview ==
The Urama Chausuyama Kofun is a zenpō-kōen-fun (前方後円墳), which is shaped like a keyhole when viewed from above. It is located on a small hill between the Yoshii River and the Sunagawa River flowing through eastern Okayama Prefecture. The tumulus, which is orientated to the east, has a total length of about 138 meters, with its circular posterior portion having a diameter of about 81 meters and a height of about 13.8 meters. The anterior rectangular portion, which is about 61 meters wide at the tip, spreads out in the shape of a shamisen plectrum. The posterior circular part is built in three stages and has remnants of breccia fukiishi and shards of trapezoidal-size cylindrical haniwa. However, the tumulus has been much transformed from its original form, and its original scale is a matter of speculation. The anterior part was cultivated as a field, and now it is a park with cherry trees. The posterior portion has a bamboo grove and a cemetery on its north side. Residential complexes are located on the east and south sides of the burial mound. It is believed to have originally been a half-scale replica of the Hashihaka Kofun in Sakurai, Nara with which it is contemporary in age.

In 1988, an archaeological excavation confirmed a vertical pit-type stone burial chamber in the posterior porton of the tumulus, which was constructed by slabs of andesite which had been quarried in what is now northern Kagawa Prefecture or one of the islands in the Seto Inland Sea. The floor of the burial camber was covered with clay containing red pigment, and it is presumed that a split bamboo-shaped wooden coffin was placed inside. However, the burial chamber had been robbed during the Meiji period and most of the grave goods have been lost. The 1988 excavation did find fragments of a bronze mirror, bronze and iron arrowheads, iron swords, spears and axes, and agricultural tools such as sickles and spades.

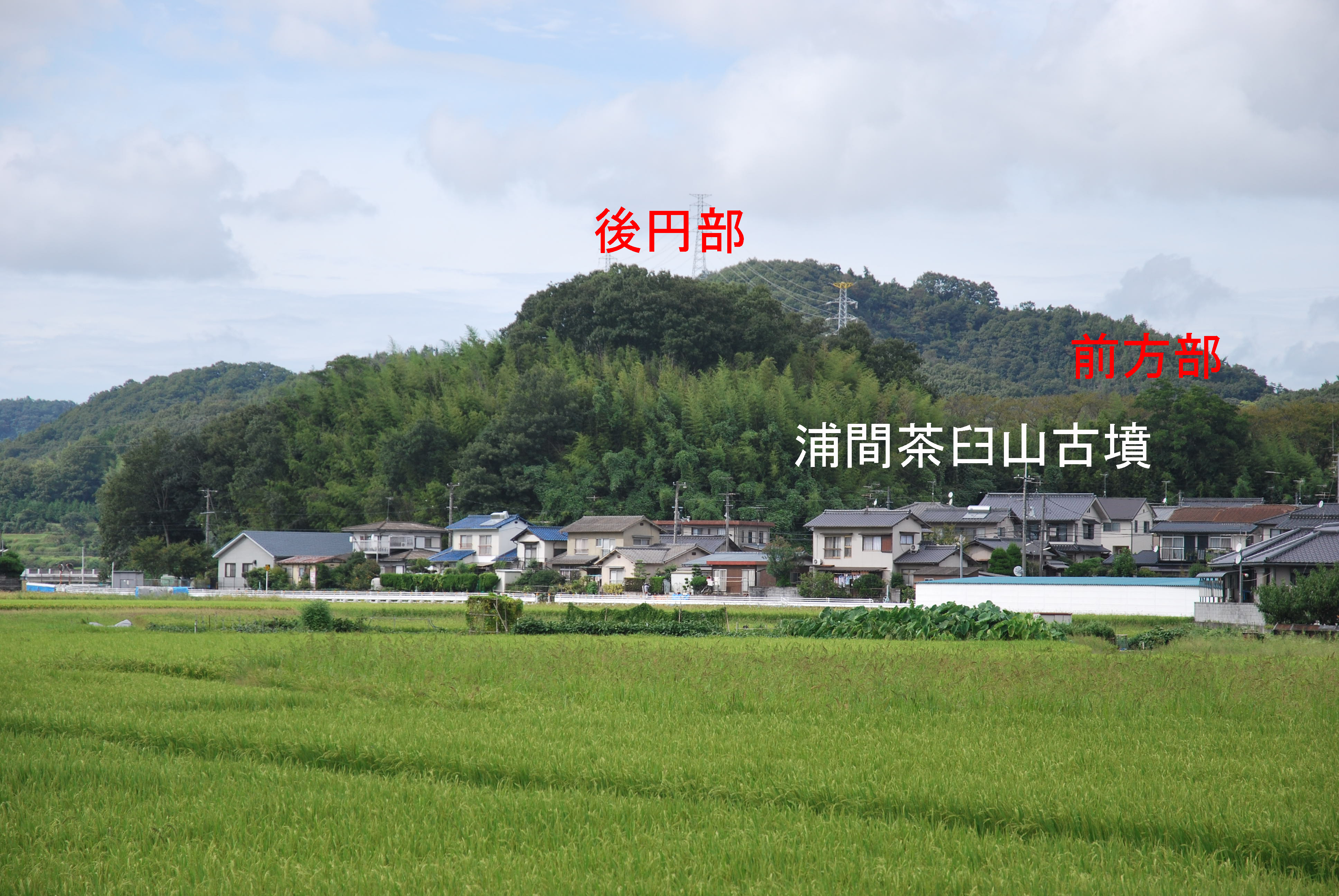
Panoramic view

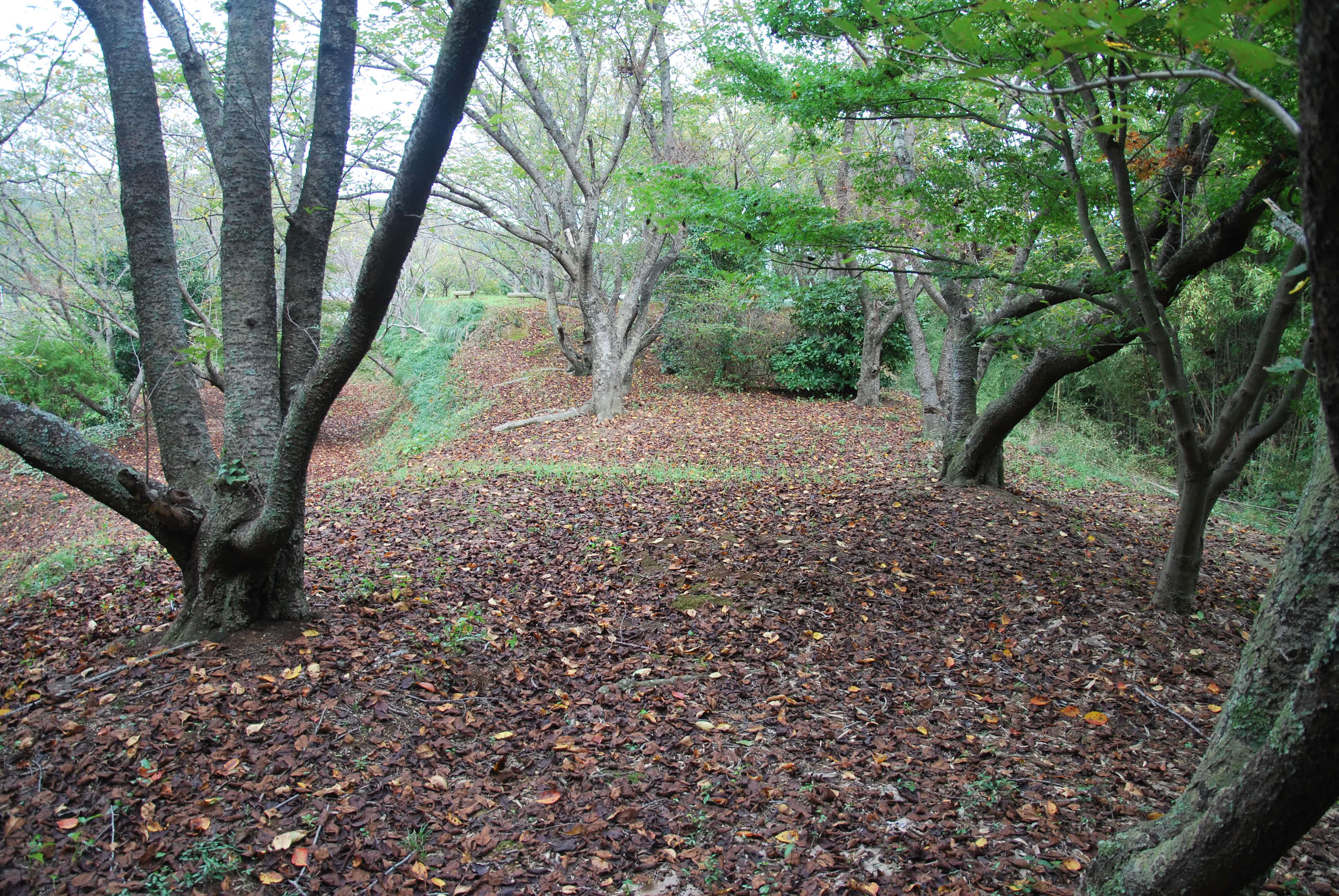
Anterior Portion

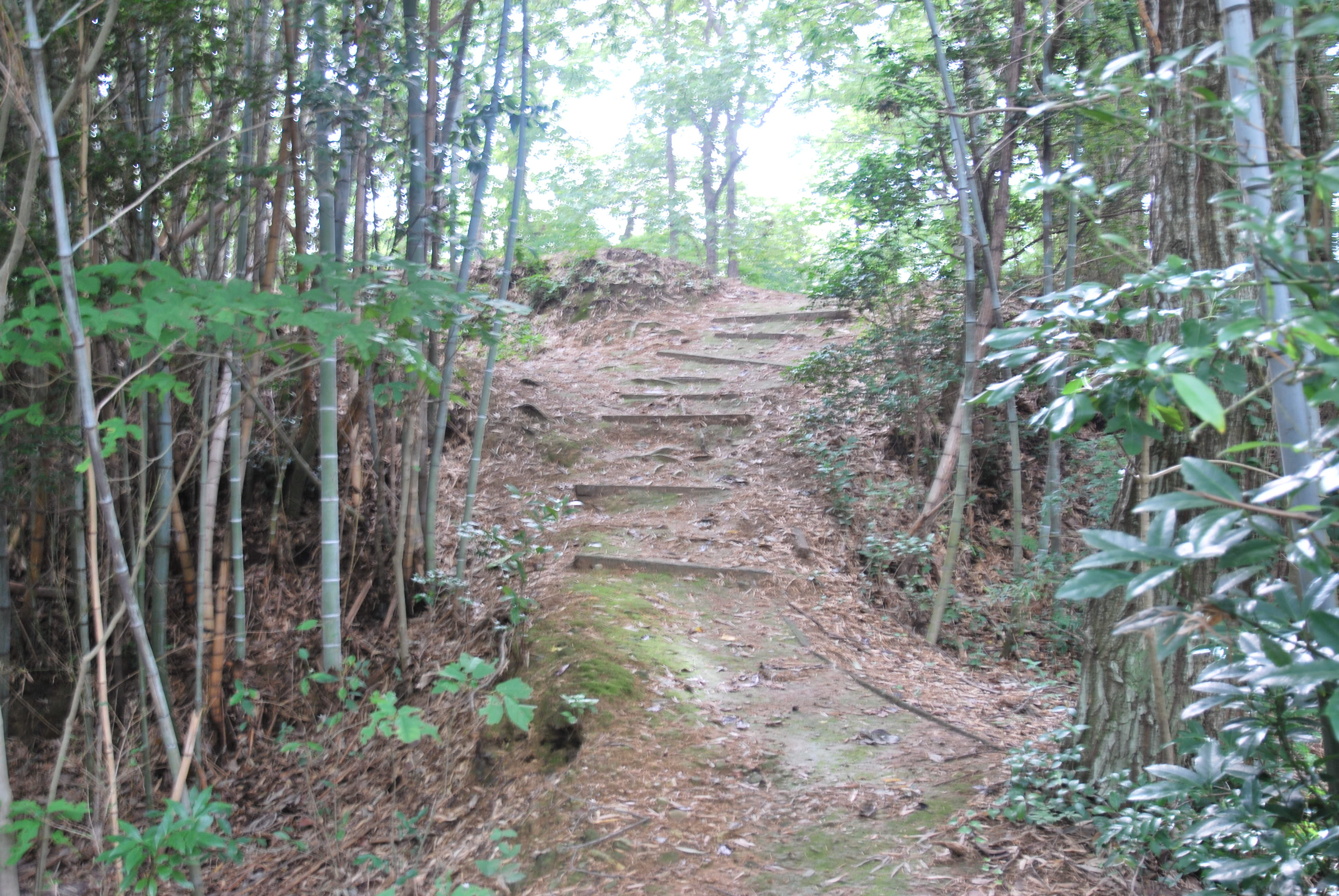
Posterior Portion

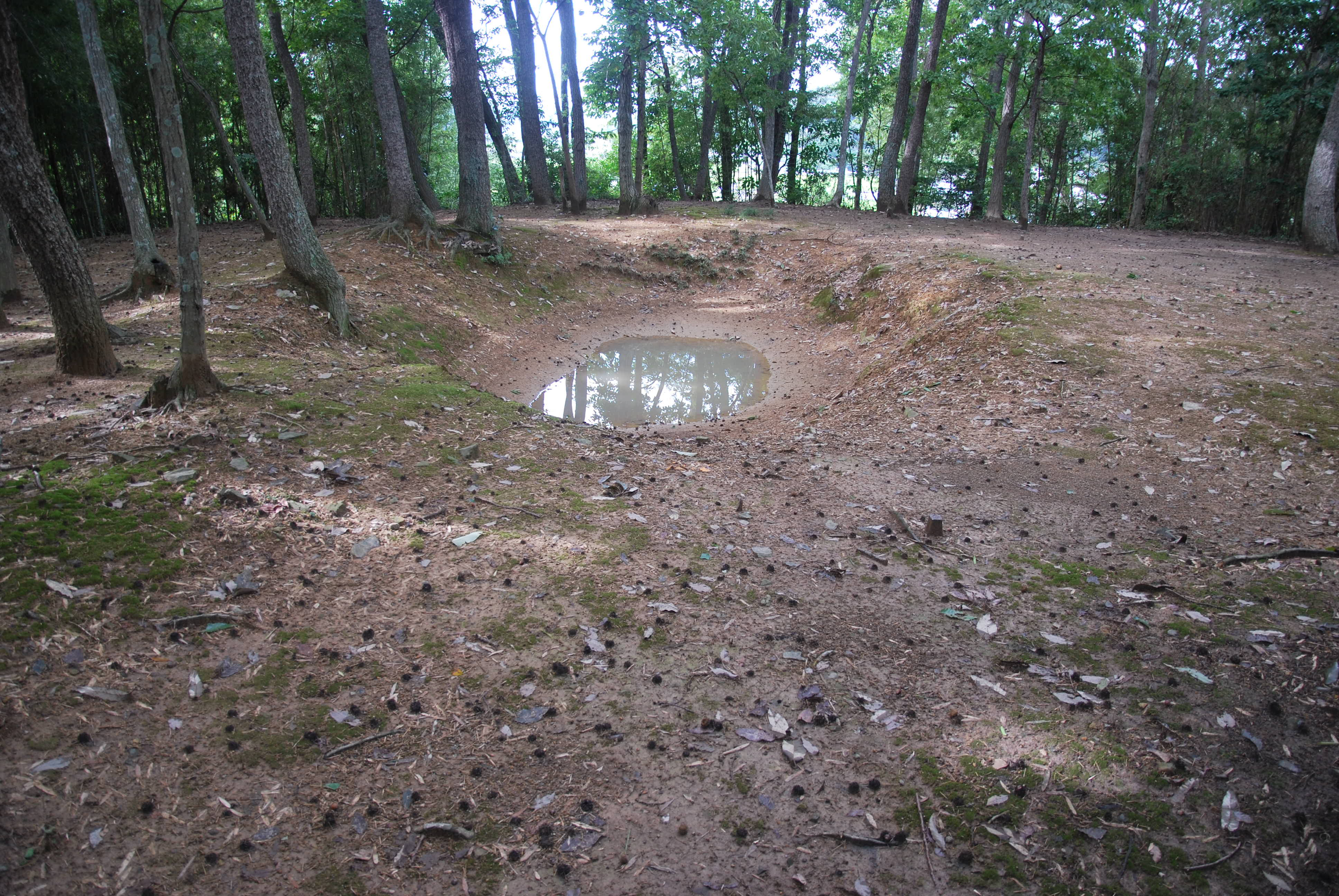
Site of Burial Chamber

== See also ==
- List of Historic Sites of Japan (Okayama)
