= Okayama Orient Museum =

Museum in Okayama, Japan

- 岡山市立オリエント美術館
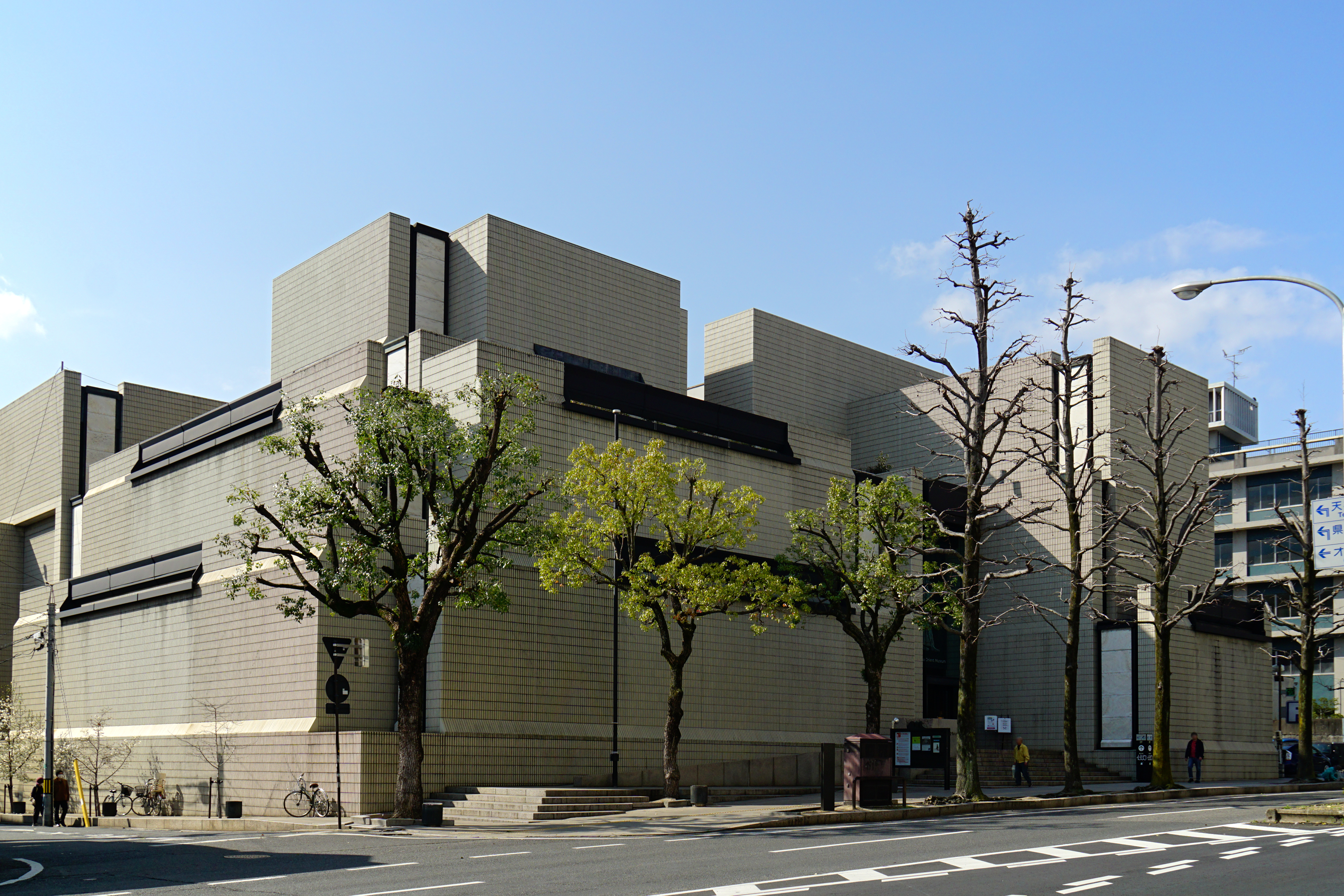
- Okayama Orient Museum
- Established: 1979
- Location: 9-31 Tenjin-chō, Kita-ku, Okayama, Okayama Prefecture, Japan
- Coordinates: 34°39′59″N 133°55′48″E
- Owner: Okayama City
- Website: www.city.okayama.jp/orientmuseum

Okayama Orient Museum (岡山市立オリエント美術館, Okayama Shiritsu Oriento Bijutsukan) is a museum of Ancient Near Eastern, Roman provincial, Byzantine, Sassanian, and Islamic Art in Kita-ku, Okayama, Okayama Prefecture, Japan. As of 2007 there were some 4,852 items, including a winged Assyrian relief from the palace of Ashurnasirpal II in Nimrud, Mesopotamia, acquired to mark the institution's 25th anniversary.

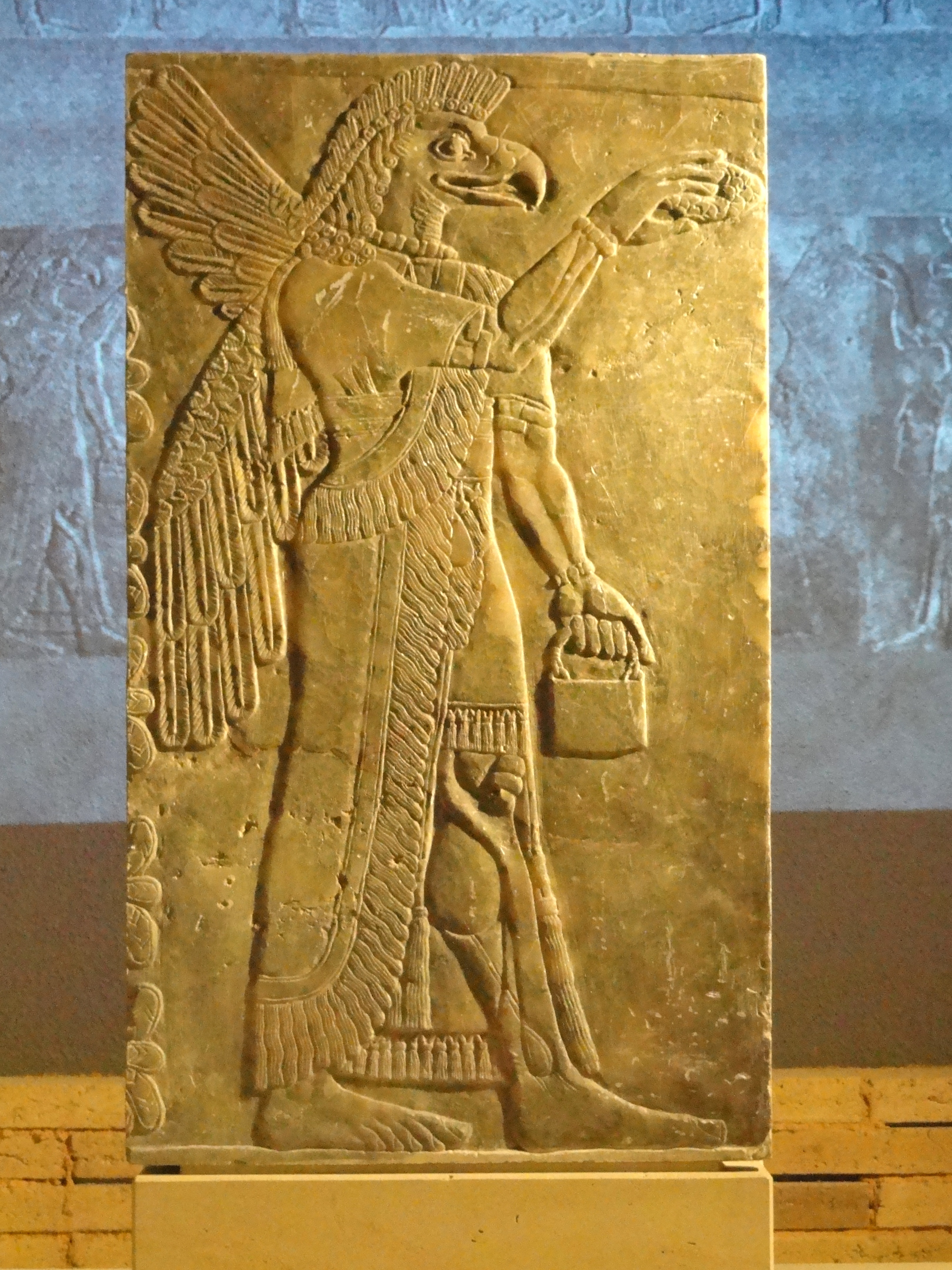
Winged Assyrian relief from the 9th century BCE

The museum was founded to house the collection of Shinjiro Yasuhiro, who acquired thousands of objects with the advice of academics from the University of Tokyo.

The museum building has two floors of exhibition galleries to showcase the collection. It was constructed in 1979 by the city of Okayama from a prize-winning design by Okada Architect & Associates.

== See also ==
- Orient
- Antiquities trade
- Miho Museum
- Okayama Station
