= Seiji Hagiwara =

Japanese politician (born 1956)

- 萩原 誠司

Mayor of Mimasaka
- Incumbent
- Assumed office 30 March 2014
- Preceded by: Masao Michiue

Member of the House of Representatives
- In office 11 September 2005 – 21 July 2009
- Preceded by: Kazuoi Nose
- Succeeded by: Hiroki Hanasaki
- Constituency: Chūgoku PR

Mayor of Okayama
- In office 10 February 1999 – 25 August 2005
- Preceded by: Keisuke Ataka
- Succeeded by: Shigeo Takaya

Personal details
- Born: 28 April 1956 (age 70) Nishiawakura, Okayama, Japan
- Party: Liberal Democratic
- Other political affiliations: New Renaissance (2010)
- Education: University of Tokyo

Seiji Hagiwara (萩原 誠司, Hagiwara Seiji; born 28 April 1956) is a Japanese politician of the Liberal Democratic Party, a member of the House of Representatives in the Diet (national legislature) representing the Second District of Okayama Prefecture. A native of Nishiawakura, Okayama and graduate of the University of Tokyo he joined the Ministry of International Trade and Industry in 1980, attending Princeton University in the United States while in the ministry. At age 37, he was the deputy director in MITI's Industrial Policy Bureau. After leaving the ministry in 1998, he was elected for mayor of Okayama, Okayama in 1999, serving for two terms. In 2005 he was elected to House of Representatives for the first time. He represents the 2nd District of Okayama Prefecture, which includes the city of Okayama.
