= Jingūjiyama Kofun =

Kofun period burial mound in Kita-ku, Japan

- 神宮寺山古墳 (Japanese)
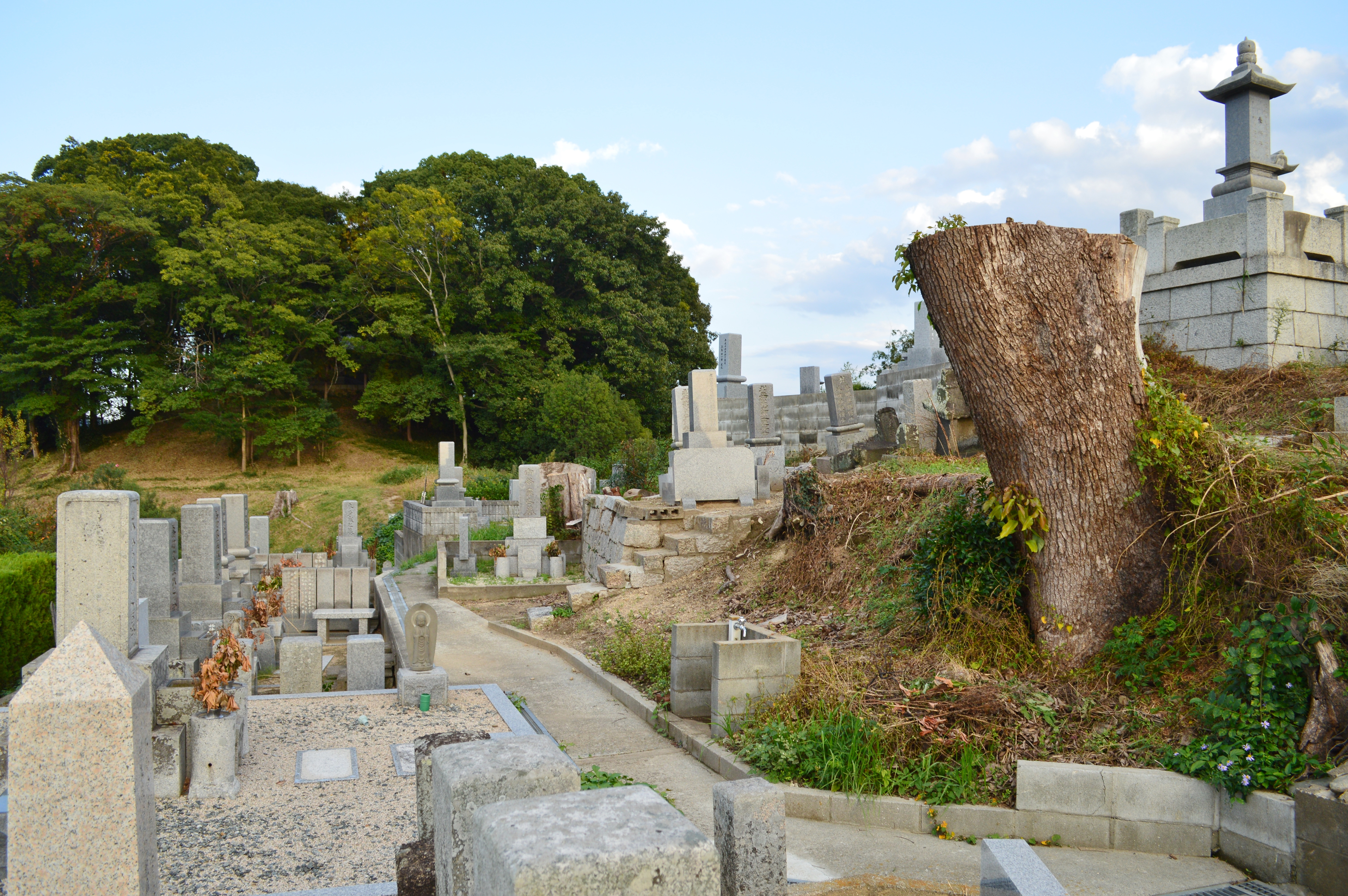
- Jingūjiyama Kofun, Anterior to the right; Posterior to the left

- Jingūjiyama Kofun Jingūjiyama Kofun (Japan)
- Interactive map of Jingūjiyama Kofun
- 34°41′1.46″N 133°55′49.77″E
- Type: Kofun
- Periods: Kofun period
- Location: Kita-ku, Okayama, Okayama Prefecture, Japan
- Region: San'yō region

History
- Built: mid 4th century

Site notes
- Public access: Yes (no facilities)

Jingūjiyama Kofun (神宮寺山古墳) is a Kofun period burial mound located in the Nakai neighborhood of Kita-ku, Okayama, Okayama Prefecture, in the San'yō region of Japan. The tumulus was designated a National Historic Site of Japan in 1959.

== Overview ==
The Jingūjiyama Kofun is a zenpō-kōen-fun (前方後円墳), which is shaped like a keyhole when viewed from above. It is located on the alluvial plain on the west bank of the Asahi River, in the south of Okayama Prefecture, slightly north of central Okayama city. The tumulus is currently occupied by the Amahakari Shrine (天計神社), an ancient Shinto shrine listed in the early Heian period Engishiki records; however, its appears that this shrine was relocated to this site from its original location in the Sengoku period by order of Kobayakawa Hideaki. The tumulus was also located in the grounds of a Buddhist temple, the Myōhōzan Jingū-ji, from which it takes its name, but this temple was closed in the Kanbun era (1661-1672) of the Edo Period. However, during the period that it was within the grounds of the temple, the anterior portion of the tumulus was turned into a cemetery, and the posterior circular portion was flattened.

The tumulus is orientated to the west, has a total length of about 155 meters, and a round posterior portion with a diameter of about 70 meters and a height of about 13 meters and was built in three stages. The anterior part has a length of 75 meters, height of seven meters and was built in two stages. Fukiishi and shards of cylindrical haniwa have been found, but is it uncertain of the tumulus originally had a moat. The main burial chamber is a vertical pit-style stone chamber located at the top of the posterior circular portion, and there also a pit-type auxiliary chamber for the burial of grave goods nearby. The cover stone for the burial chamber is exposed under the floor of the Haiden of the Amahakari Shrine on the top the mound, but as it has yet to be excavated, the details of the interior are unknown. The auxiliary chamber, which measures1.50 meters in length, 0.50-0.60 meters in width, and about 0.90 meters in height was excavated in 1961, and more than 100 iron weapons (swords, spears) and iron agricultural tools (scythes, axes, chisels, drills, and saws) were found.

It is speculated that there may be a secondary burial chamber in the anterior portion of the tumulus which has yet to be discovered as fragments of swords, armor, and spears have been unearthed in that area the past.

This tumulus is estimated to have been constructed in the latter half of the early to early middle Kofun period, around the latter half of the 4th century to the beginning of the 5th century, based on the unearthed haniwa. Most of the tumuli in the Kibi region are built on hilly terrain, so this tumulus attracted attention because it was built on alluvial land, which is normally considered unsuitable for large burial mounds.

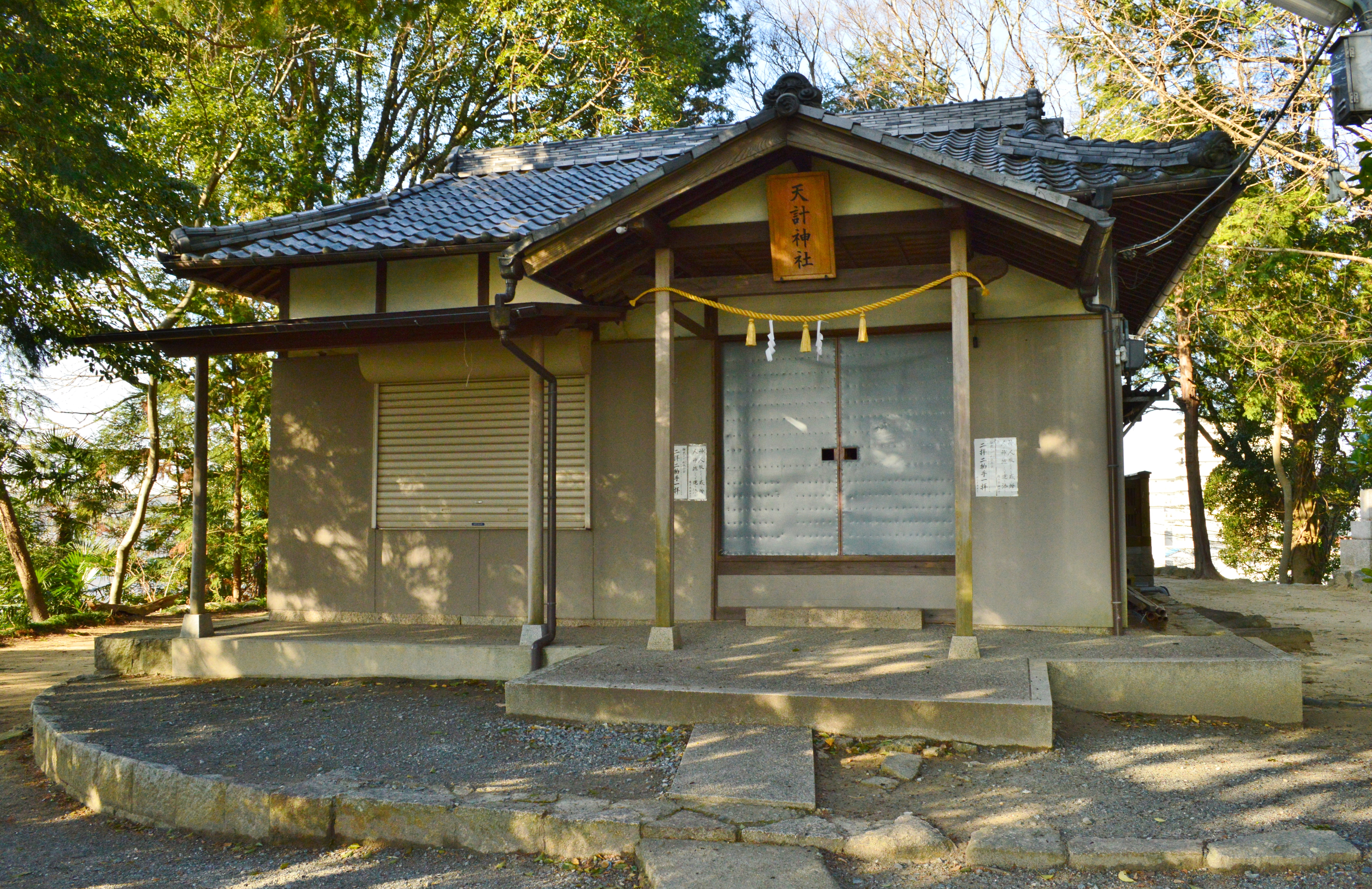
Amahakari-jinja, Haiden

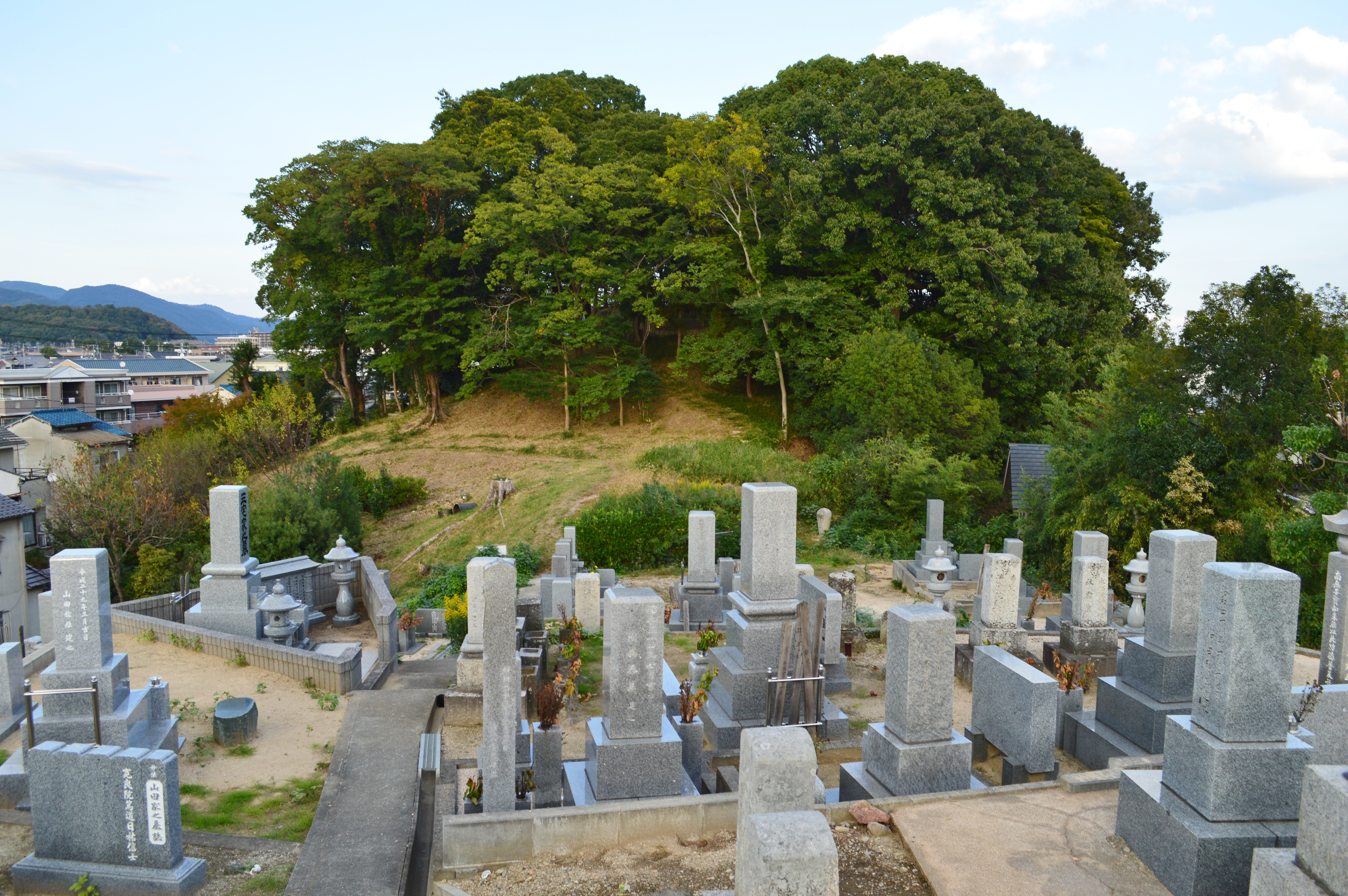
View of the rear circle from the front

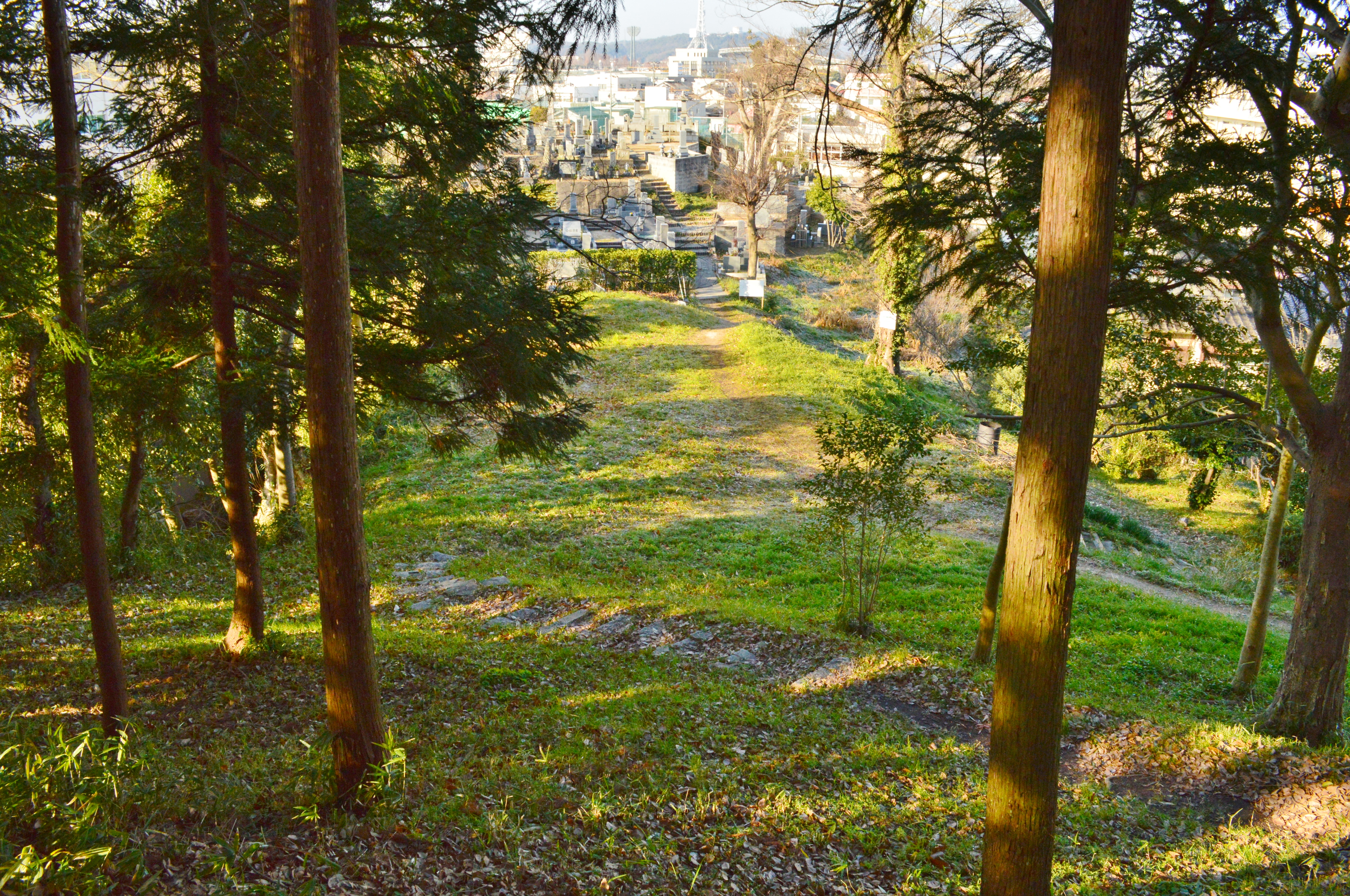
Looking forward from the rear circular part

== See also ==
- List of Historic Sites of Japan (Okayama)
