= Tsushima Site =

Archaeological site in Japan

- 津島遺跡 (Japanese)
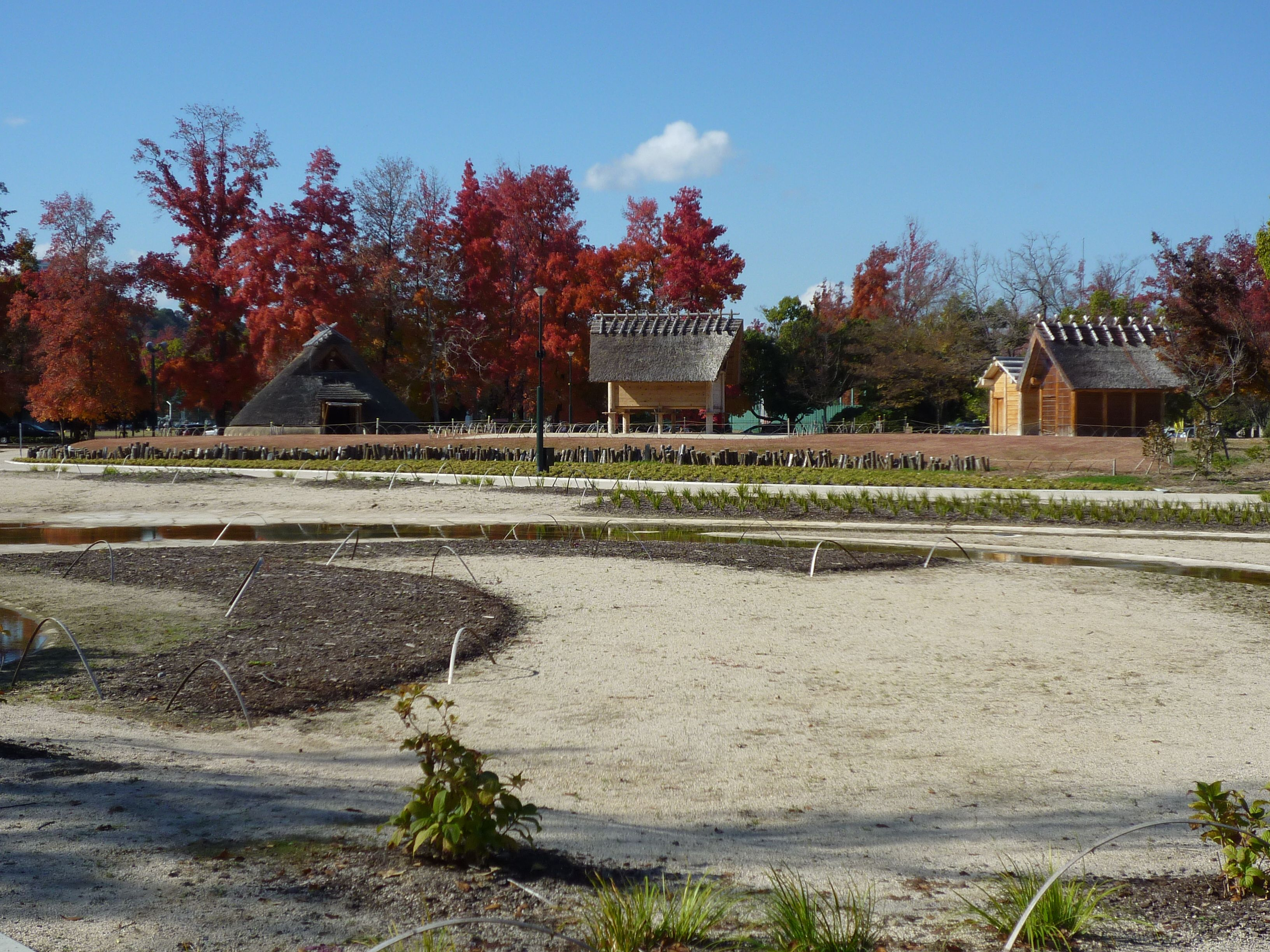
- Tsushima Site

- Tsushima Site Tsushima Site (Japan)
- Interactive map of Tsushima Site
- 34°40′45″N 133°54′59″E
- Type: Kofun
- Periods: Yayoi period
- Location: Kita-ku, Okayama, Okayama Prefecture, Japan
- Region: San'yō region

Site notes
- Public access: Yes (park and museum)

Tsushima Site (津島遺跡, Tsushima Iseki) is an archaeological site with the traces of a Yayoi period settlement, located in the Izumi neighborhood of Kita-ku, Okayama, Okayama Prefecture, in the San'yō region of Japan. It was designated a National Historic Site of Japan in 1971, with the area under protection expanded in 2002.

== Overview ==
The Tsushima Site is located on a portion of the Okayama Prefectural Multipurpose Grounds, the site of a former Imperial Japanese Army parade ground which was developed in 1962 with a multi-purpose athletic stadium, gymnasium, swimming pools, baseball fields, museum and other public facilities. Archaeological excavations from 1968 uncovered relics and remains from the Yayoi period through the Kofun period, Nara period, Heian period, and the end of the Kamakura period. Of the greatest academic interest was a water channel for paddy fields from the early Yayoi period and a rectangular building site contained the traces of circular pit dwellings and raised pillar warehouse from the early Yayoi period. This was the first time in Japan that a village and paddy field from the early Yayoi period had been discovered. The settlement was on a slight highland formed in the delta area of the Asahi River, with the paddy fields in a very narrow swampy area of 3 to 5 acres. The presence of rice pollen, seeds and leaves of various paddy weeds also proved that the paddy soil itself remained in situ. The boundary between the paddy field and the swamp itself was demarcated by a row of piles, and the boundary with the slightly elevated land was demarcated by a row of planks, but no fortification of the settlement was found. Later investigation found that more paddy fields of the early Yayoi period demarcated by ridges were scattered over a wide area. A large number of wooden artifacts and shards of Yayoi pottery were also found.

The site is now an archaeological park with reconstructions of pit dwellings and raised-floor warehouses, and paddy fields. The items excavated are on display at the Ruins and Sports Museum (遺跡&スポーツミュージアム) at site, which is located about 20 minutes on foot from JR West Okayama Station.

== See also ==
- List of Historic Sites of Japan (Okayama)
