= Ōmeguri-Komeguri Mountain Castle =

- 大廻小廻山城跡
- Higashi-ku, Okayama, Okayama Prefecture, Japan
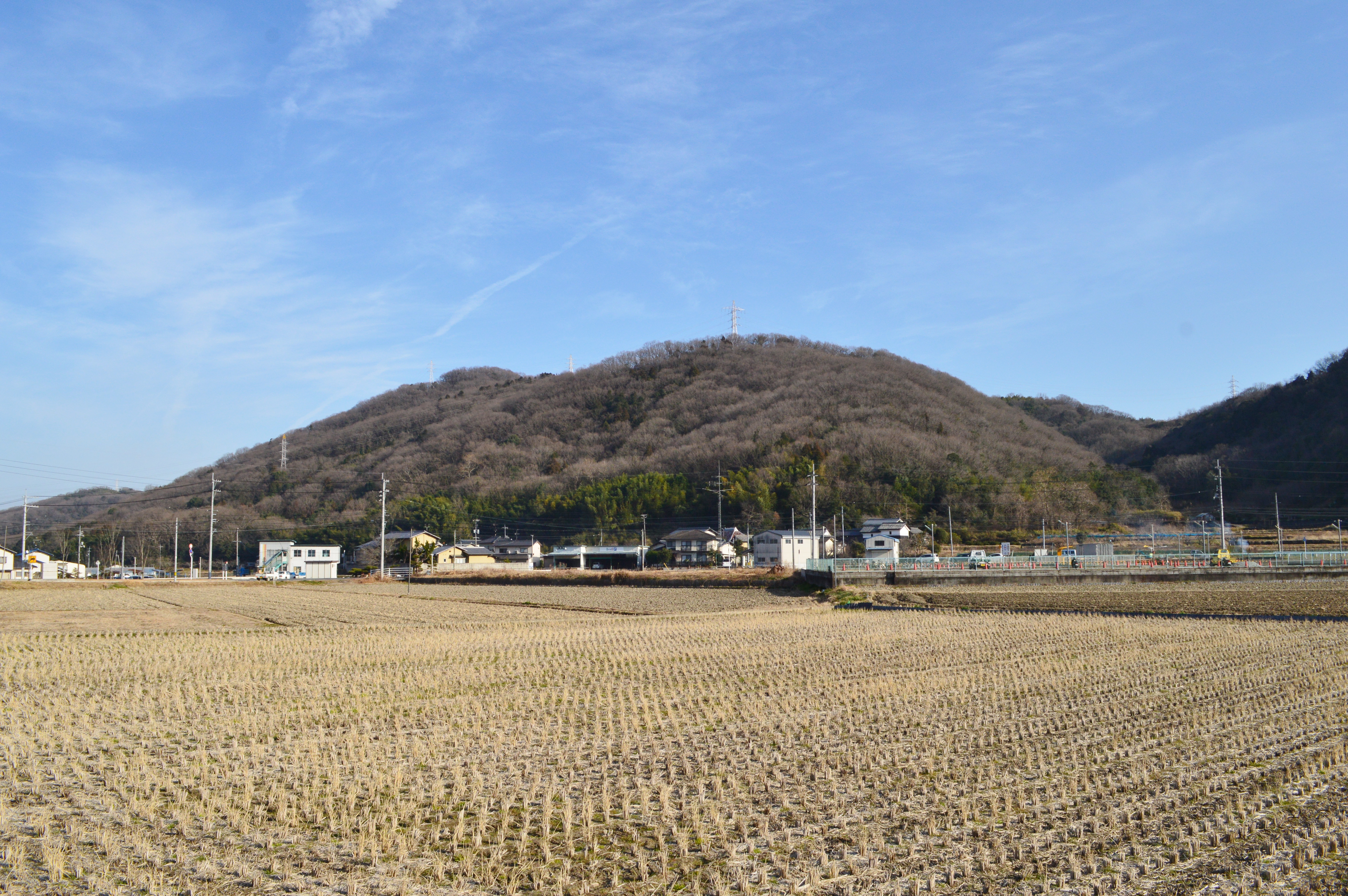
- Ōmeguri-Komeguri Mountains

Site information
- Type: Korean-style fortresses in Japan (朝鮮式山城, Chōsen-shiki yamajiro)
- Condition: Ruins

Location
- Ōmeguri-Komeguri Mountain Castle Ōmeguri-Komeguri Mountain Castle (Japan)
- Coordinates: 34°43′11.28″N 134°1′23.13″E

Site history
- Built: c.7th century
- In use: Asuka period
- National Historic Site of Japan

Ōmeguri-Komeguri Mountain Castle (大廻小廻山城, Ōmeguri-Komeguri yamajirō) was an ancient castle (also known as a Korean-style fortresses in Japan (朝鮮式山城, Chōsen-shiki yamajiro) located in what is now the Kusakabe neighborhood of Higashi-ku of the city of Okayama, Okayama Prefecture, in the San'yō region of Japan. Its ruins have been protected as a National Historic Site since 2005.

== History ==
After the defeat of the combined Baekje and Yamato Japan forces, at the hands of the Silla and Tang China alliance at the Battle of Hakusukinoe in 663, the Yamato court feared an invasion from either or both Tang or Silla. In response, they built a huge network of shore fortifications throughout the rest of the 600s, often with the assistance of Baekje engineers, generals and artisans. Unaware of the outbreak of the Silla-Tang War (670–676), the Japanese would continue to build fortifications until 701, after finding out that Silla was no longer friendly with Tang.

The fortifications encompass the summits of Mount Omawari and Mount Komawari, a mountain massif with an elevation of 198.8 meters northeast of the center of Okayama City. There is no mention of this fortification in historical documentation, so its actual name and any details of its history are unknown. The ruins were discovered in a survey in 1973, and as a result of archaeological excavations from 1984 to 1988 by the Okayama City Board of Education, the total length of the fortification was found to be 3.2 kilometers. Rows of locally quarried granite stones were covered with rammed earth embankments, with a width of between five and ten meters and a height of around two meters. Water gates were built in three locations where the castle walls crossed a valley. No remains of gates or of any buildings within the enclosure have been discovered, but they are presumed to exist on the flat land at the summit of Mount Komawari since the summit of Mount Komawari is the highest point within the enclosed area, Some historians speculate that a beacon platform was installed. In terms of location, the fortification was in a position to protect the provincial capital of Bizen Province and overlooked the strategic San'yōdō highway.

The fortification is estimated to have been contemporary with Ki Castle and to have been constructed in the 7th century.

On the eastern hillside of the castle ruins is the Buddhist temple of Jōraku-ji, which is said to have been founded in the late Heian period. The site is about 50 minutes on foot from Seto Station on the JR West San'yō Main Line.

== Gallery ==
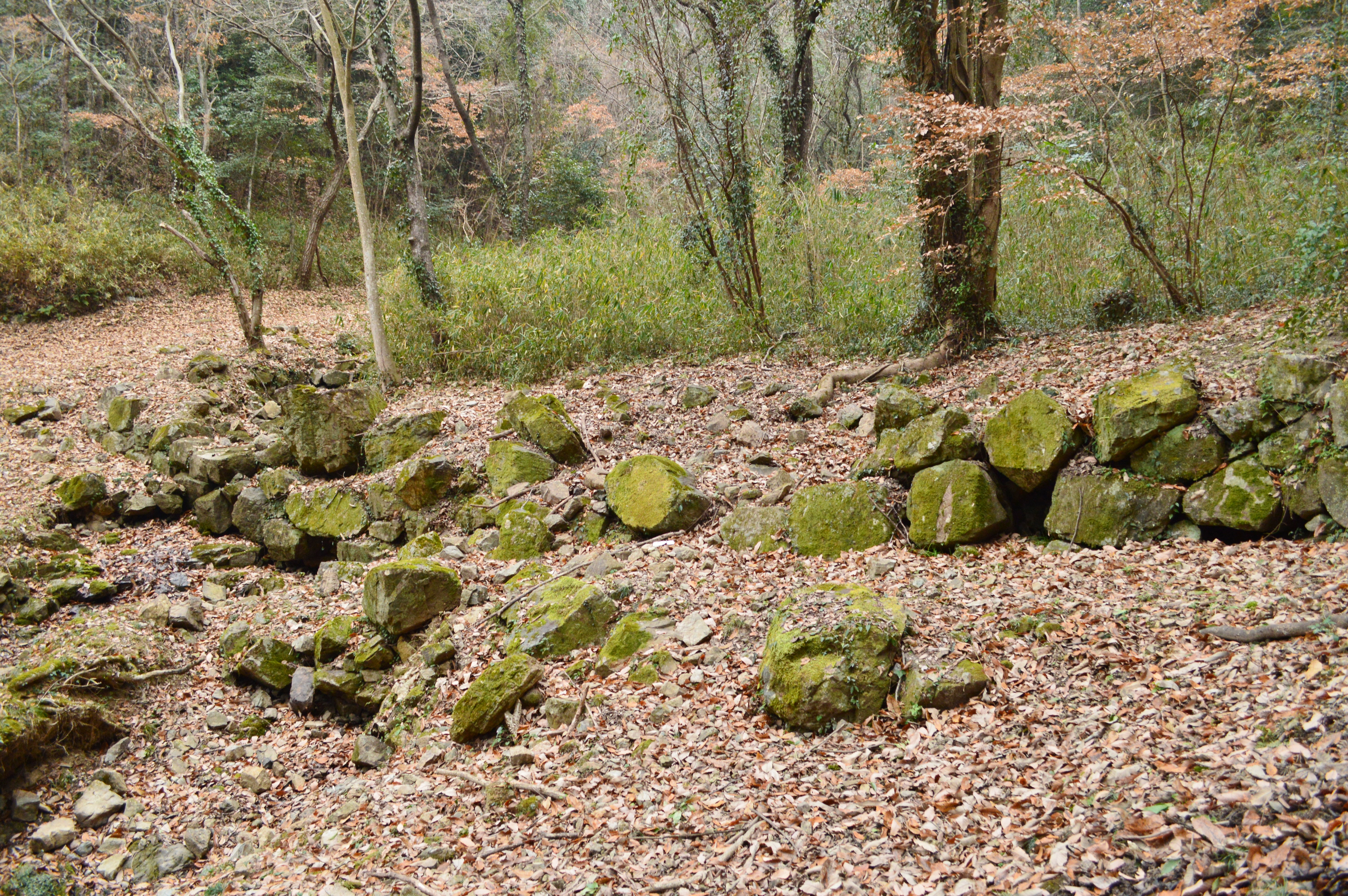
Site of a water gate

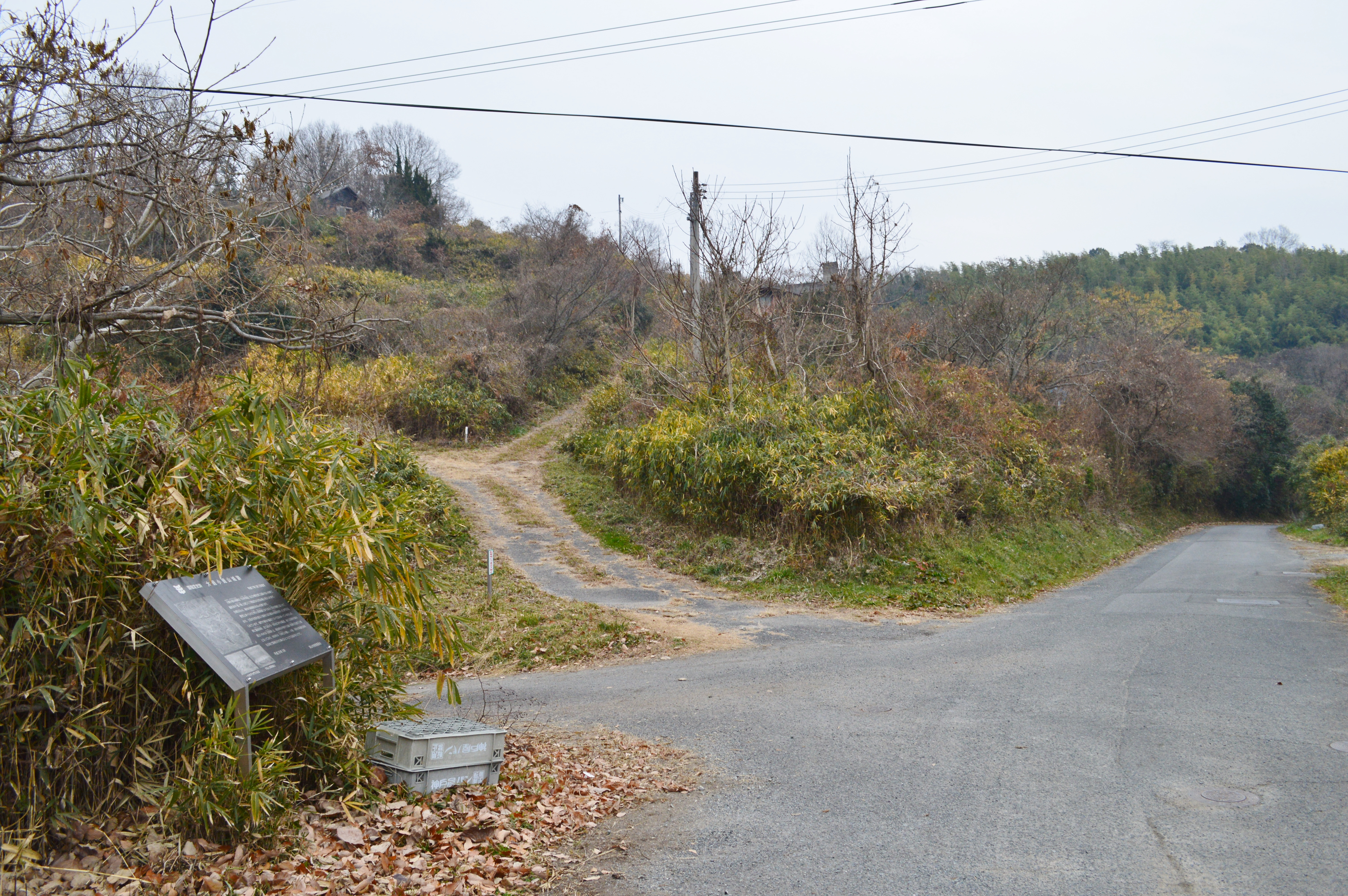
Earthworks

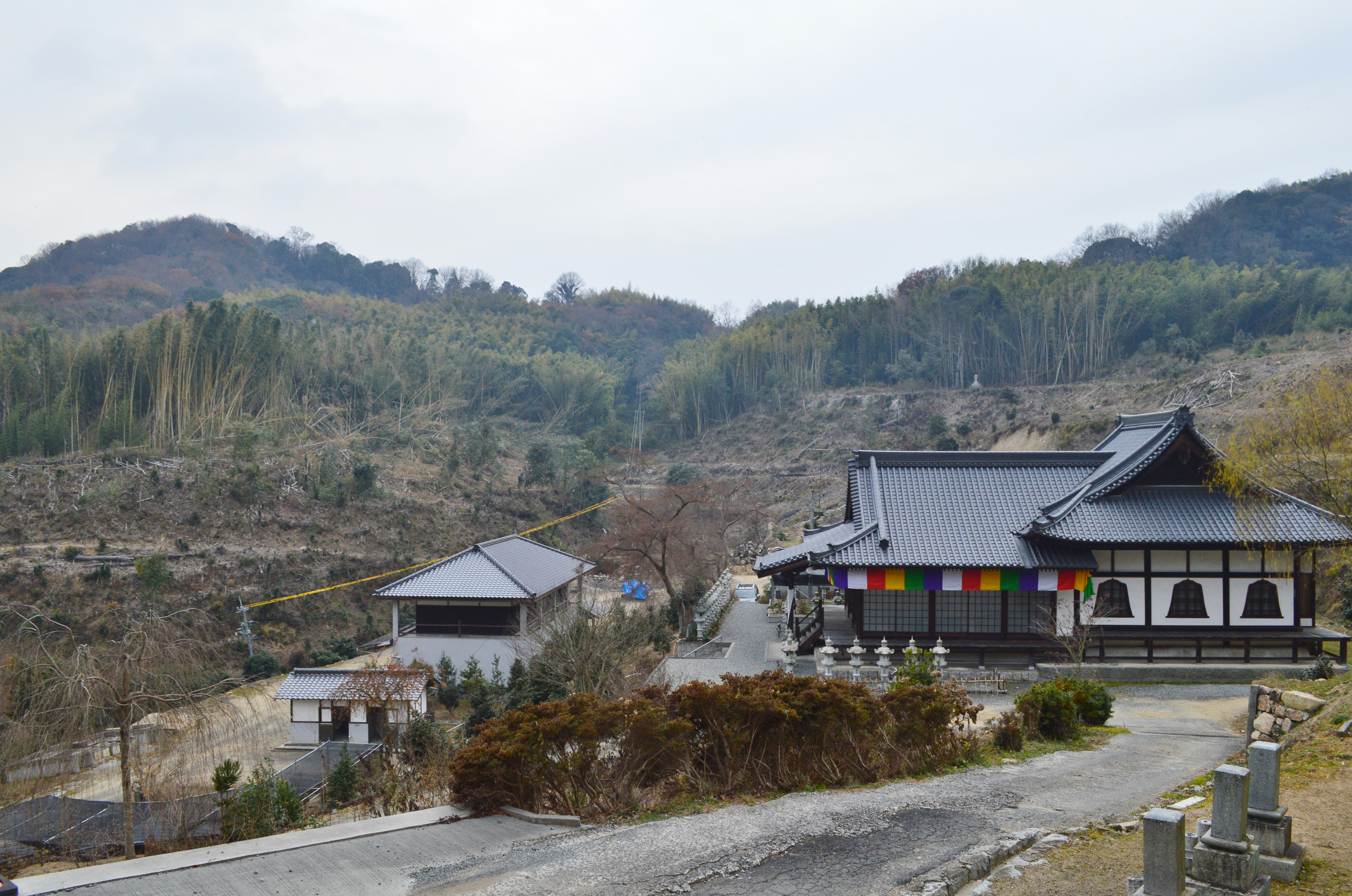
Jōraku-ji with Mount Komeguri in background

== See also ==
- List of Historic Sites of Japan (Okayama)
- List of foreign-style castles in Japan
- Kōgoishi

== Literature ==
- De Lange, William (2021). An Encyclopedia of Japanese Castles. Groningen: Toyo Press. pp. 600 pages. ISBN 978-9492722300.
- Motoo, Hinago (1986). Japanese Castles. Tokyo: Kodansha. pp. 200 pages. ISBN 0-87011-766-1.
