= Shigeo Takaya =

Japanese politician (1937–2024)

- 高谷 茂男

Mayor of Okayama
- In office 11 October 2005 – 8 October 2013
- Preceded by: Seiji Hagiwara
- Succeeded by: Ōmori Masao

Personal details
- Born: 1 January 1937 Sōja, Okayama, Japan
- Died: 8 August 2024 (aged 87)
- Party: Independent
- Education: Okayama University

Shigeo Takaya (高谷 茂男, Takaya Shigeo; 1 January 1937 – 8 August 2024) was a Japanese politician who was the mayor of Okayama in Okayama Prefecture. A graduate of Okayama Prefectural University-Junior College, he was first elected in October 2005.

Takaya died of kidney failure on 8 August 2024, at the age of 87.
