= Ishiyama =

Ishiyama is a Japanese surname. Notable people with the surname include:

- George Ishiyama (1914–2003), Japanese-American businessman
- John Ishiyama (born 1960), political scientist
- Masumi Ishiyama (born 1981), Japanese cricketer

Fictional characters:

- Yumi Ishiyama, main character from the French animated TV series Code Lyoko and Code Lyoko: Evolution.
- Principal Ishiyama, secondary character from Danny Phantom
- Ken Ishiyama, a character in My Hero Academia

== See also ==
- Ishiyama Hongan-ji, a Japanese building
