= Asahi River =

Asahi River 旭川
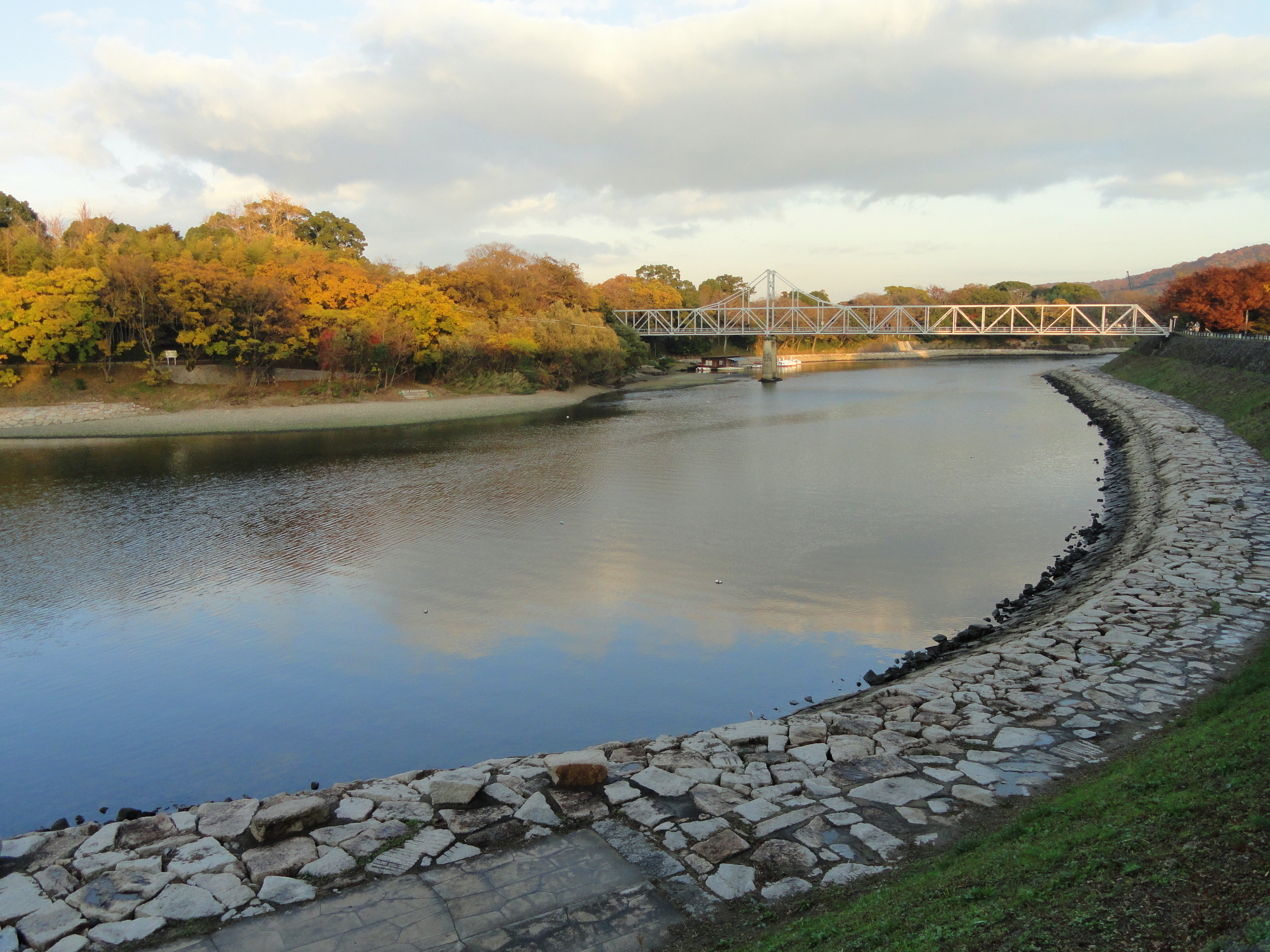
- Asahi River in 2011

- Location within Japan

Location
- Country: Japan
- State: Honshu
- Region: Okayama

Physical characteristics
- Source: Asanabewashigasen
  - elevation: 1,081 m (3,547 ft)
- Mouth: Seto Inland Sea
  - coordinates: 34°36′02″N 133°58′21″E
- Length: 142 km (88 mi)
- Basin size: 1,810 km^{2} (700 sq mi)

The Asahi River is a Class A river in Okayama Prefecture, Japan.
