= Yoshii River =

Yoshii River 吉井川
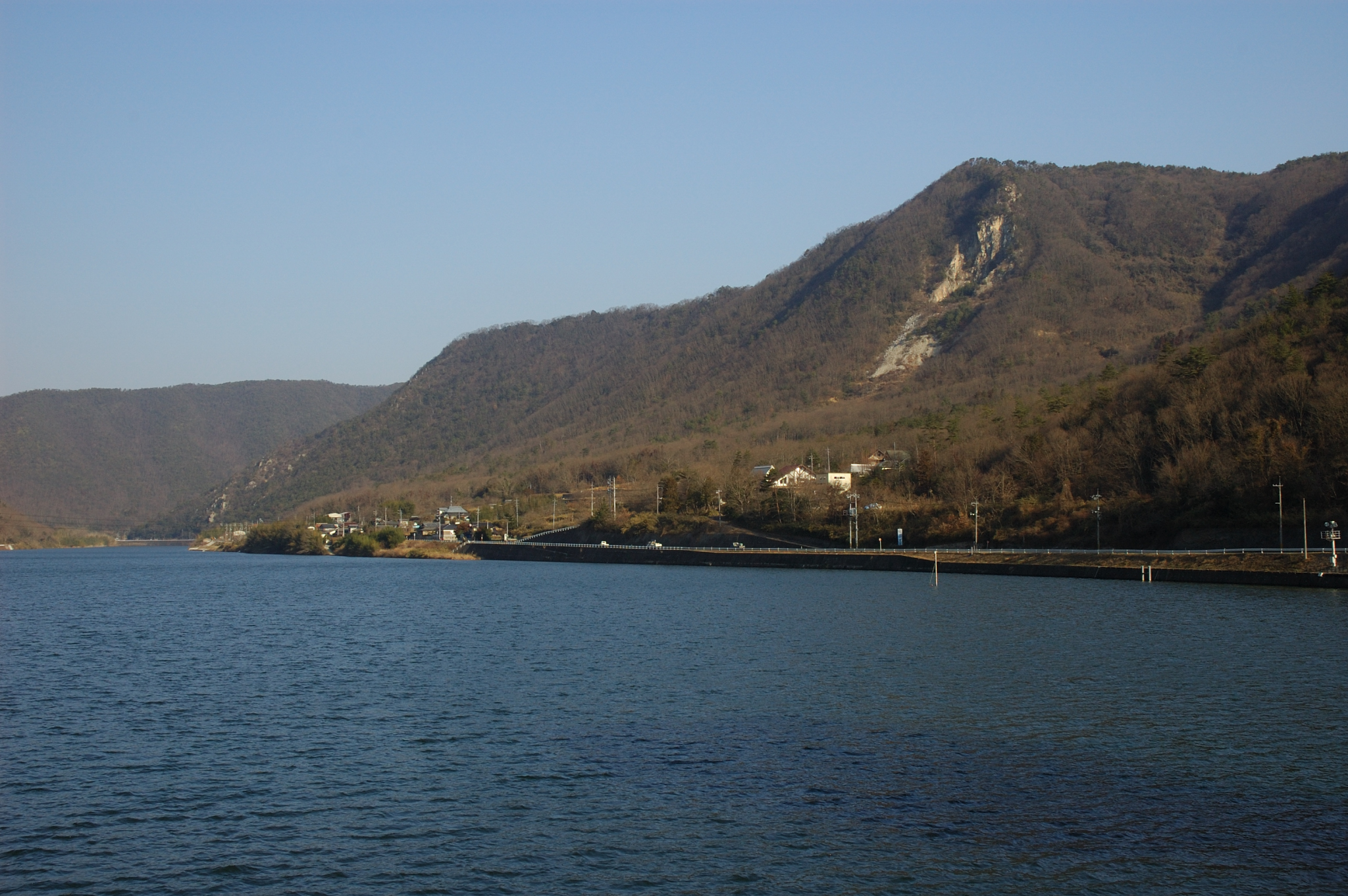
- Yoshii River in 2007

- Location within Japan

Location
- Country: Japan
- State: Honshu
- Region: Okayama

Physical characteristics
- Source: Mount Mikuni
  - elevation: 1,252 m (4,108 ft)
- Mouth: Seto Inland Sea
  - coordinates: 34°36′15″N 134°02′16″E
- Length: 133 km (83 mi)
- Basin size: 2,110 km^{2} (810 sq mi)

The Yoshii River is a Class A river in Okayama Prefecture, Japan.
