= Okayama Domain Ikeda clan cemetery =

Historic cemeteries in Okayama Prefecture, Japan

- 岡山藩主池田家墓所
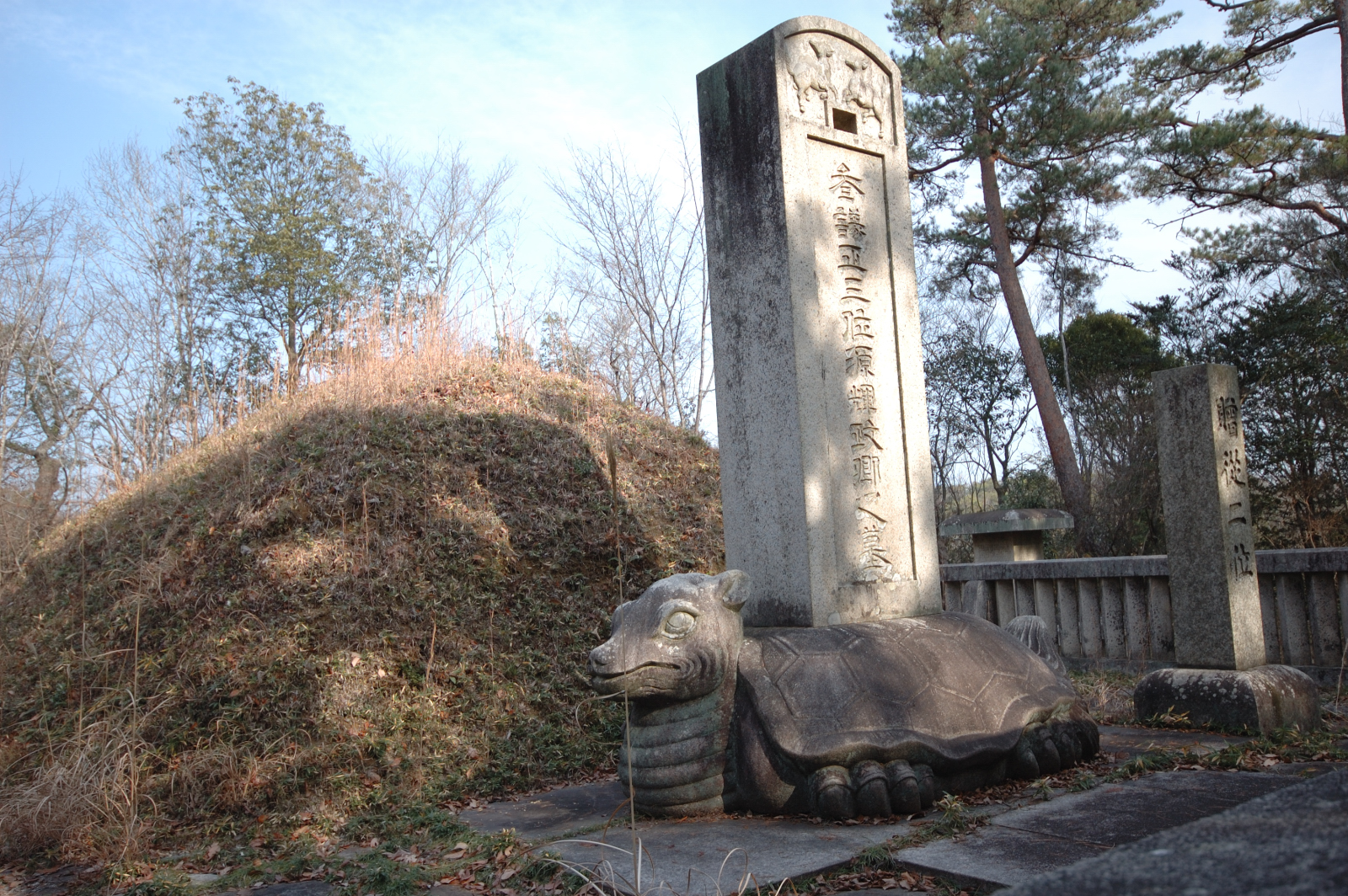
- Gravestone of Ikeda Terumasa

Details
- Established: 1667
- Location: Bizen and Wake, Okayama
- Country: Japan
- Type: daimyō cemetery
- Footnotes: National Historic Site of Japan
- Okayama Domain Ikeda clan cemetery (Okayama Prefecture) Okayama Domain Ikeda clan cemetery (Japan)

The Okayama Domain Ikeda clan cemetery (岡山藩主池田家墓所, Okayama-han-shu Ikeda-ke bosho) is the cemetery for the successive Ikeda clan daimyō of Okayama Domain of Edo period, Japan. It consists of three separate locations within Okayama Prefecture, and was collectively designated a National Historic Site in 1998.

== Overview ==
The Ikeda clan were senior retainers of the Tokugawa clan. In 1603, Ikeda Tadatsugu, the second son of Ikeda Terumasa of Himeji Domain was awarded Okayama with a kokudaka of 280,000 koku. This was increased in 1613 with an additional 100,000 koku. However, he died in 1615 without an heir and the domain was transferred to his younger brother, Ikeda Tadao castellan of Yura Castle on Awaji Island, albeit with a reduction from 380,000 to 315.000 koku. After Ikeda Tadao's death in 1632, his heir, Ikeda Mitsunaka was regarded by the Tokugawa shogunate as being too young to be entrusted with the critically important Okayama Castle, with its strategic location on the San'yōdō highway and reassigned him to Tottori Domain. Okayama went to his cousin, Ikeda Mitsumasa, formerly of Tottori Domain. His descendants would continue to rule Okayama until the Meiji restoration.

=== Waidani Atsushi Tsuchiyama Ikeda Clan Cemetery ===
The Waidani Atsushi Tsuchiyama Ikeda Clan Cemetery (和意谷池田家墓所, Waidani Atsushi Tsuchiyama Ikedake Bosho) is located in the Yoshinaga-cho neighborhood of Bizen, Okayama. The impetus for constructing this cemetery was when the clan's bodaiji in Kyoto, the Gokoku-in chapel of Myōshin-ji burned down. This temple held the graves of Ikeda Mitsumasa's grandfather, Ikeda Terumasa, and father, Ikeda Toshitaka. Mitsumasa decided to move these graves to Bizen Province and ordered his senior retainer, Tsuda Nagatada, to locate a suitable site. After more than a year of searching, this present site was selected, and construction began in 1667, with the reburial of Ikeda Terumasa and Toshitaka the following year per Confucian rituals. Further construction was delayed when Okayama Domain was ordered by the Tokugawa shogunate to repair the dry moat of Edo Castle, but was completed in 1669. The cemetery consists of seven sets of tombs.

The first is that of Ikeda Terumasa, in the form of a bixi, a tortoise-shaped base stone and a flat monument, both made of granite, and the second is for Ikeda Toshitaka and his wife Tsuruhime. The third is for Ikeda Mitsumasa and his wife Katsuhime. The fourth is for the eighth daimyō, Ikeda Yoshimasa and his wife Utako. The fifth is for the ninth daimyō, Ikeda Shigemasa and his wife Manjuko. The sixth contains six graves, one of which is for Ikeda Teruoki, daimyō of Akō Domain, who reportedly went mad, killing his wife and consorts. Two others in this set are for Ikeda Tsunemoto and Ikeda Masachika, daimyō of Yamasaki Domain. The seventh set is located about 600 meters northeast of the sixths set. It contains the graves of Ikeda Toshimasa (younger brother of Toshitaka, lord of Funage Castle in Harima), Ikeda Masatora (younger brother of Toshitaka), Ikeda Masasada (younger brother of Mitsumasa), and Mutsuhime (daughter of Mitsumasa).

=== Sōgen-ji ===
Sōgen-ji (曹源寺) is a Myōshinji branch Rinzai school Zen temple in Maruyama, Naka-ku, Okayama. It was constructed by Ikeda Tsunamasa, and was dedicated to his great-great-grandfather Tsuneoki and his father Mitsumasa, and became the bodaiji of the clan. The temple is noted for its Japanese garden, which makes extensive use of borrowed scenery, and for an unusual feature in that sub-temples dedicated to other Buddhist sects (Tendai, Shingon, Nichiren and Jōdo were erected on the side of the temple grounds. The daimyō cemetery is in the back of the temple. Starting with Ikeda Tsunamasa, it contains the graves of all of the daimyō of Okayama with the exception of the three who are located at the Waidani Atsushi Tsuchiyama Ikeda Clan Cemetery.

=== Tsuda Nagatada's Grave ===
Tsuda Nagatada's Grave (津田永忠墓) is located on the mountainside in Nukudani, Yoshida, Wake, Okayama, Tsuda Nagatada (1640-1707) was a senior retainer to the Ikeda clan, and was responsible for the creation of the Shizutani School and many other public works projects. Due to his importance to the history of Okayama and the Ikeda clan, his family cemetery was included in the national historic site designation.

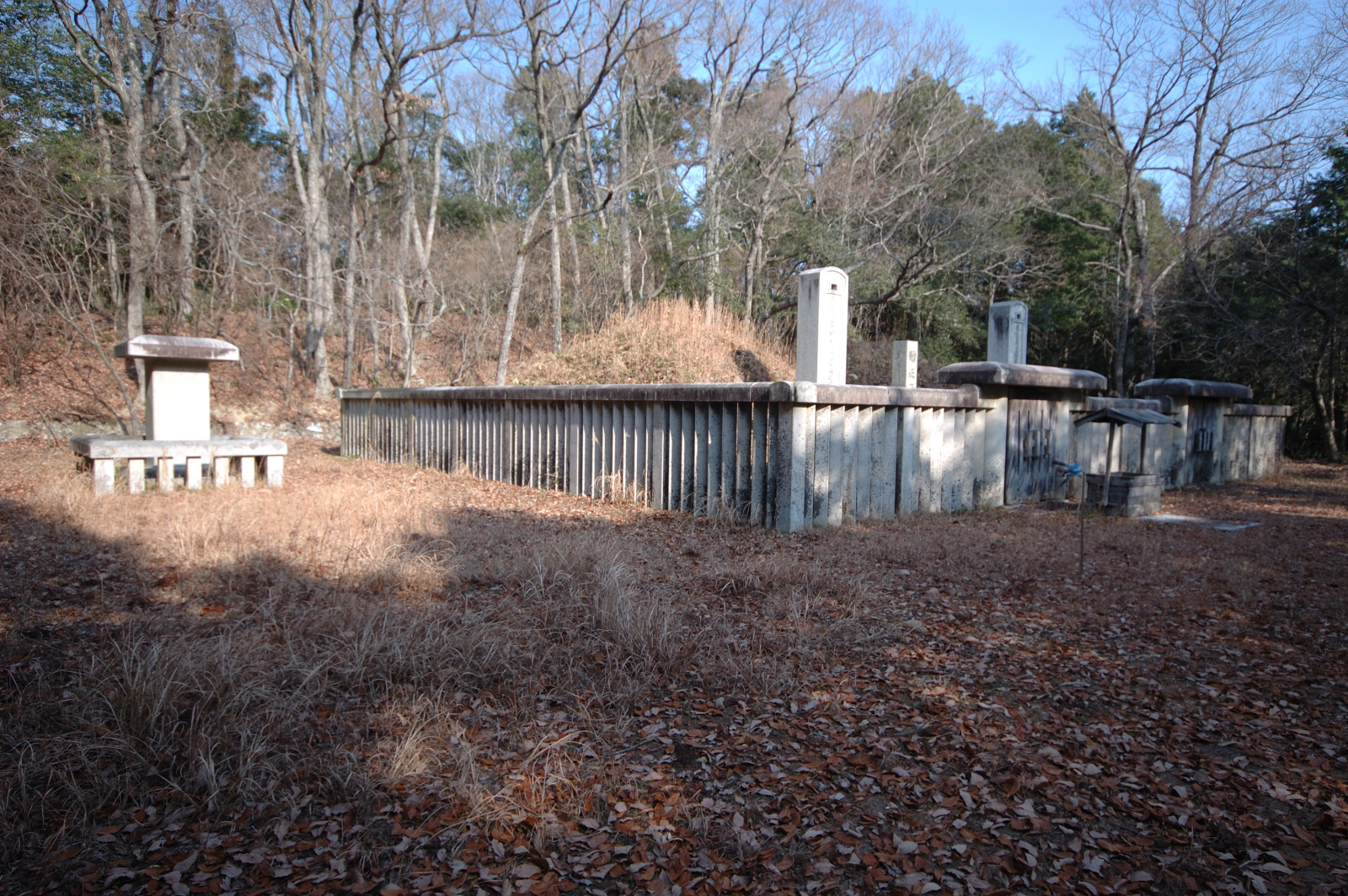
Grave of Ikeda Mitsumasa and his wife

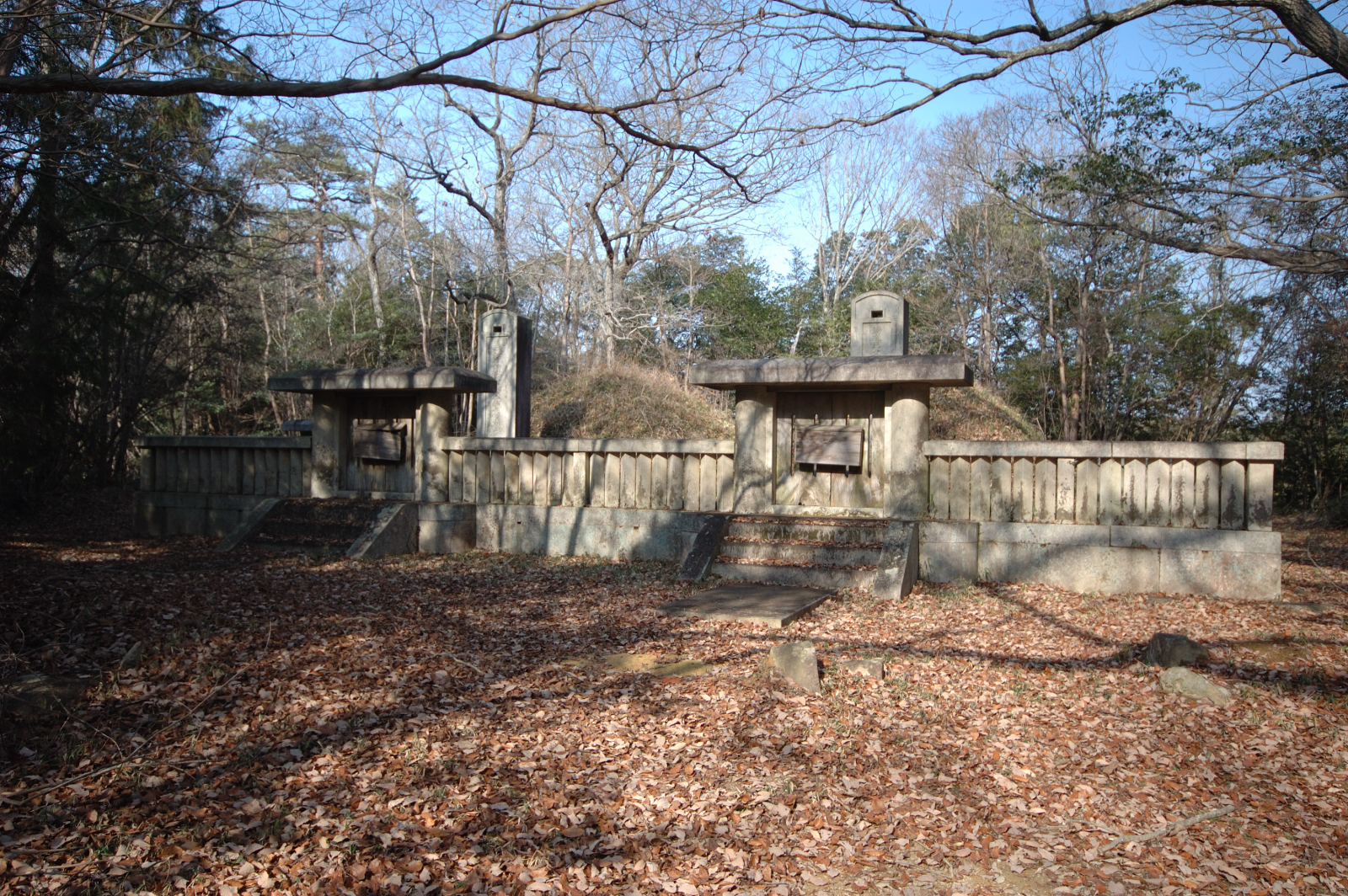
Grave of Ikeda Toshitaka

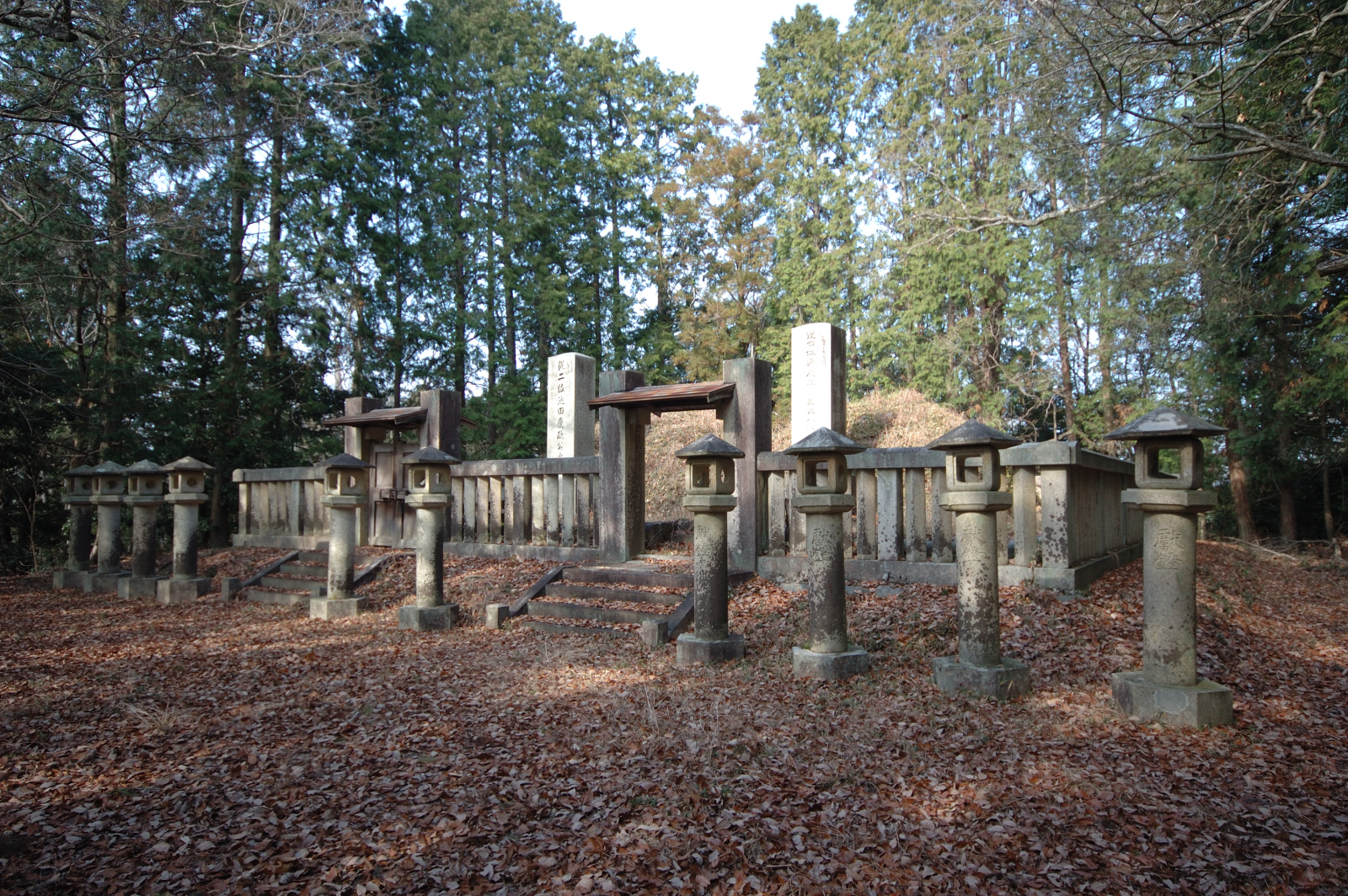
Grave of Ikeda Yoshimasa

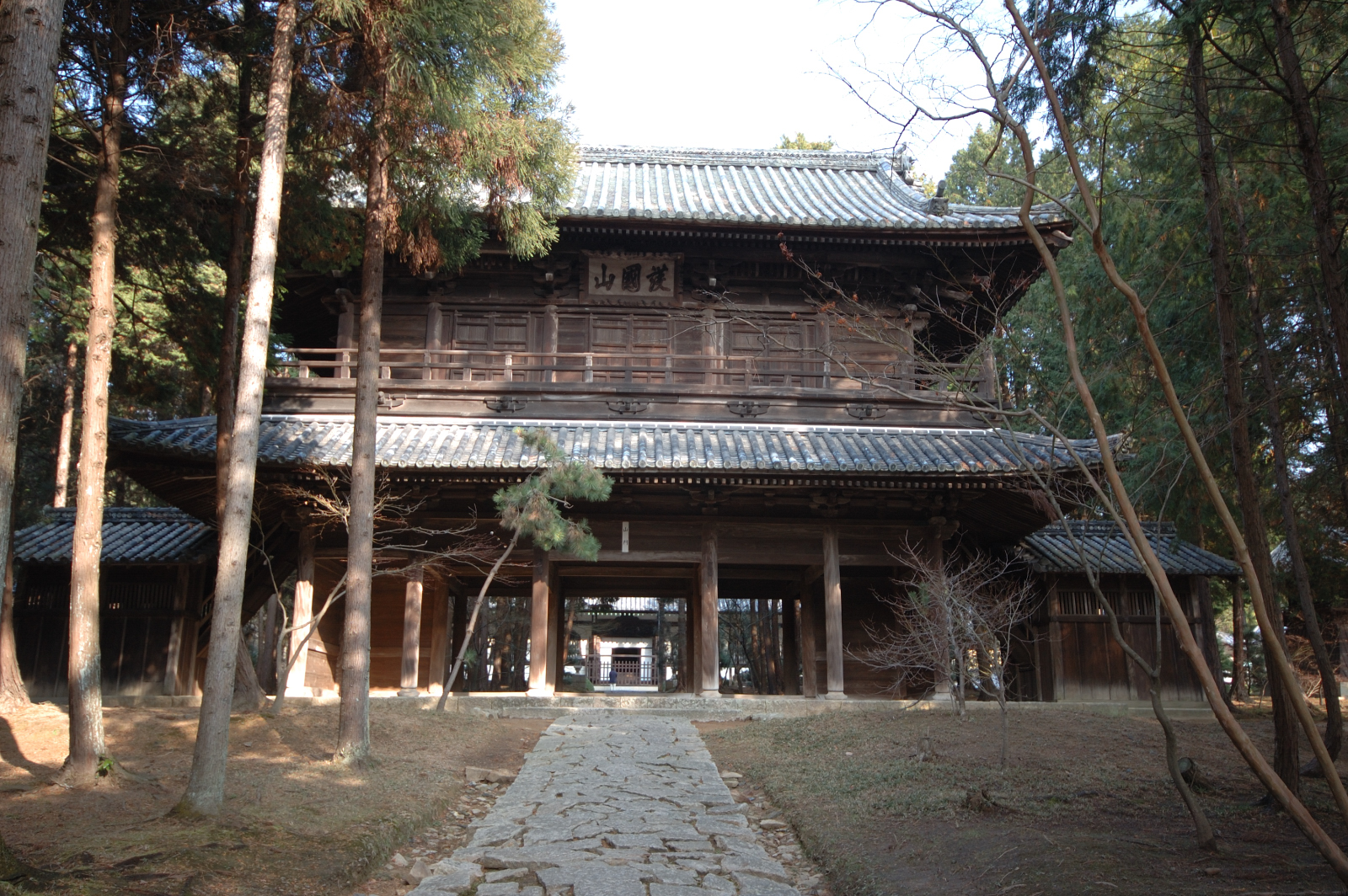
Sogen-ji Sanmon

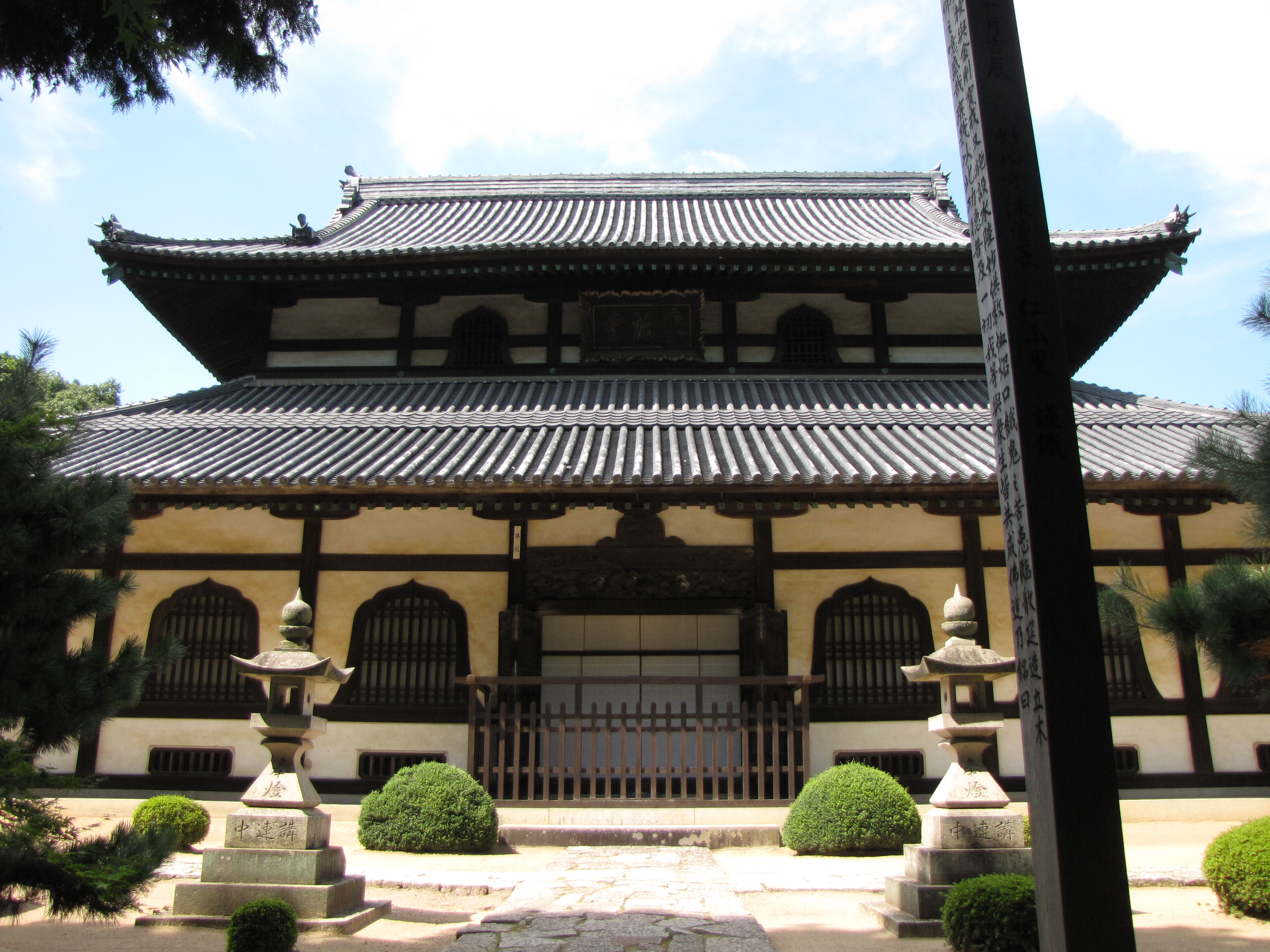
Sogen-ji Hondo

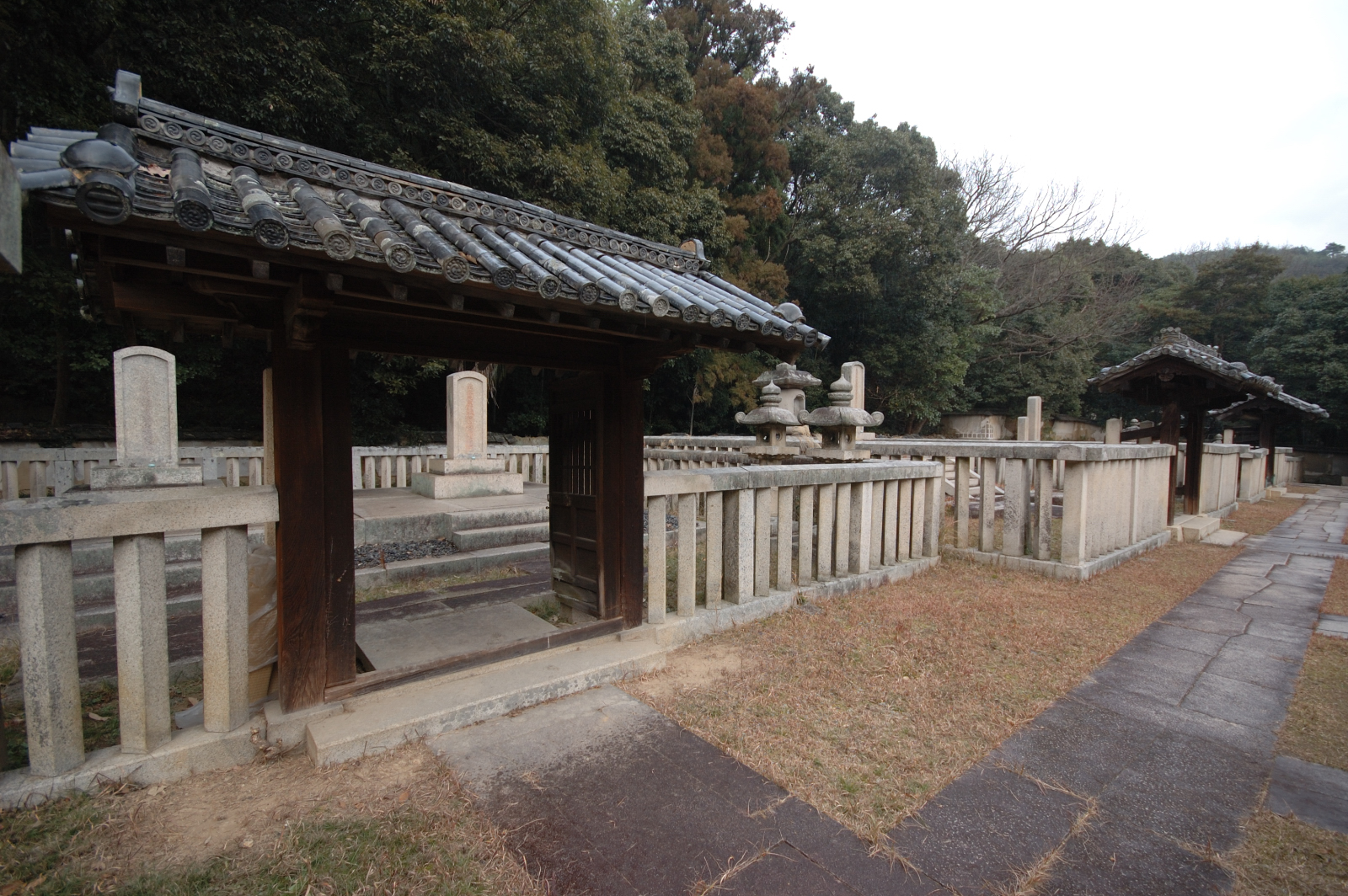
Sogen-ji Ikeda cemetery

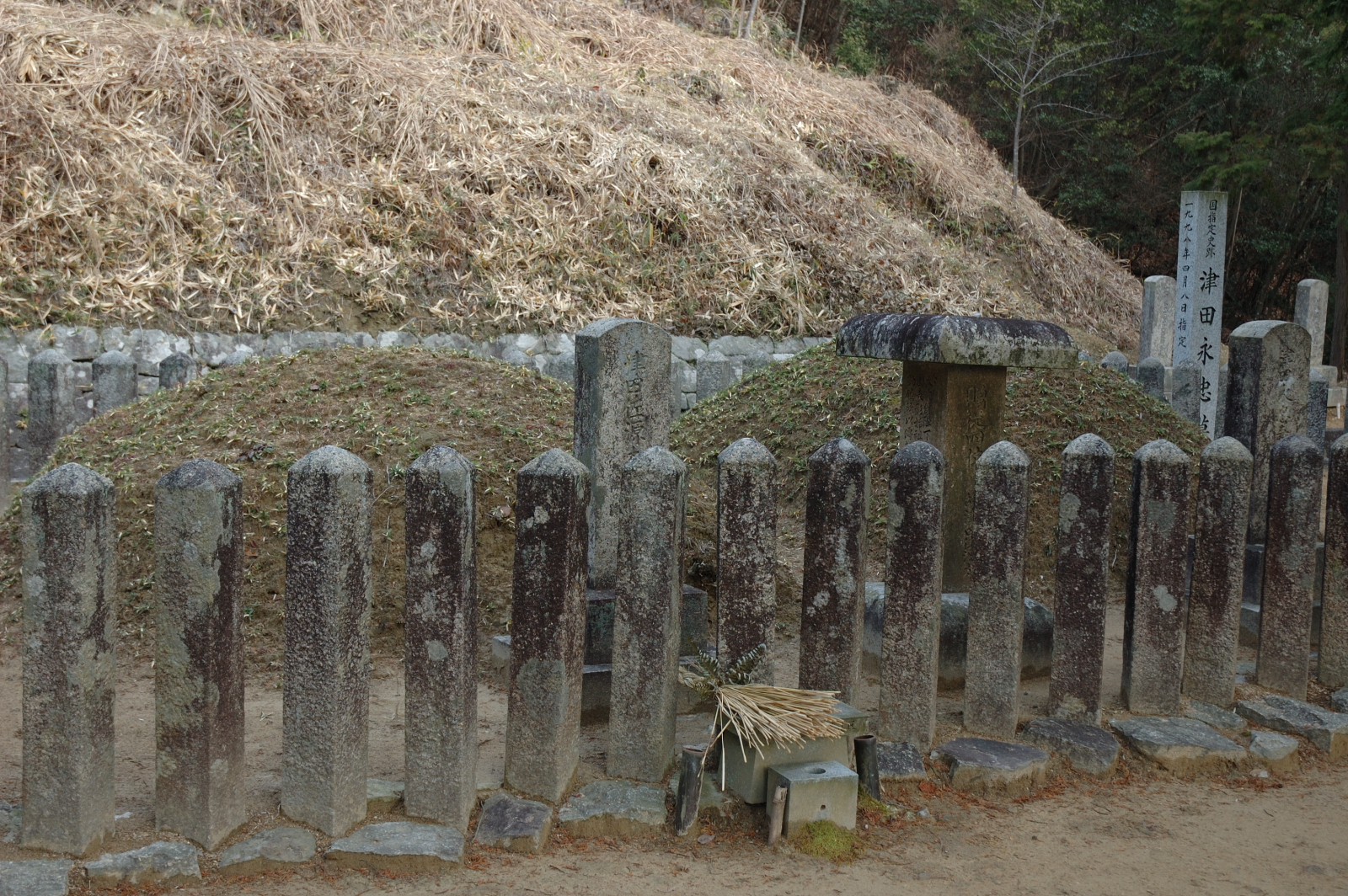
Tsuda Nagatada grave

== See also ==
- List of Historic Sites of Japan (Okayama)
