= Kentarō Hiki =

Kentarō Hiki (日置 健太郎; 30th day of the 12th month of Kaei 6 (28 January 1854) – 8 May 1922) was a Japanese kazoku (baron) of the Meiji and Taishō periods. He was head of the Hiki family of Kanagawa, hereditary karō (chief retainers) of the Okayama Domain and lords of Kanagawa. He was also known as Tadanobu. He served as a director of Tsurasuchī Savings Bank and Meiji Sangyō, and as an auditor of Keikoku Bank.

After the Meiji Restoration he temporarily took the name Komatsu Kentarō and participated in the Asaka Plain settlement project, which ultimately failed. He later returned to Okayama and became involved in education.

== Life ==
Kentarō was born in Okayama in 1854 as the second son of Ikeda Masaaki of the Amagi Ikeda family, a karō of the Okayama Domain. He was later adopted by his uncle Hiki Tadahisa, also a karō of the domain.

After the Meiji Restoration, he resolved to lead former retainers in the development of the Asaka Plain in Fukushima Prefecture (the government-sponsored Asaka Development Project). Because relatives opposed the plan, in 1880 (Meiji 13) he left the Hiki family by succeeding to the related but extinct Komatsu family and took the name Komatsu Kentarō.

On 28 December 1880 he received permission to cultivate land with ten households and settled in Taimenbara (now Atami-machi, Kōriyama, Fukushima Prefecture). He pursued large-scale farming and dairy management but the venture proved financially unsustainable. Around 1897 (Meiji 30) he returned home. The headship of the Hiki family had passed to his eldest son Nao; in 1900 (Meiji 33) Kentarō resumed the headship and the Hiki surname.

In 1898 (Meiji 31) he donated his former residential site in Uchisange, Okayama City (now the site of the Okayama Prefectural Library) and, with financial assistance from the former domain lord Ikeda Akimasa, founded the private Yōchū School. In 1904 (Meiji 37) he relocated and reorganized the school in the former domain territory of Kanagawa village, Mitsu District (now Mitsu-Kanagawa, Okayama City), establishing the private Kanagawa Middle School (predecessor of Okayama Prefectural Kanagawa High School) and serving as its first principal.

In September 1906 (Meiji 39), in recognition of his ancestors' services, he was granted the rank of baron by special imperial decree. In December 1911, together with his daughter Yasuko and her husband Hatano Uhō, he converted to Islam, taking the Muslim name Ahmad.

He died on 8 May 1922 (Taishō 11).

== Family ==
- The Hiki family had served the Ikeda family since the Sengoku period. When the domain founder Ikeda Mitsumasa entered Okayama, Hiki Tadatoshi became lord of Kanagawa, and the family served as karō of the Okayama Domain for generations. Of the karō families of the domain with assessed revenues exceeding 10,000 koku, six were made barons after the promulgation of the Peerage Act; Kentarō's elder brother Ikeda Masakazu, who succeeded to the Amagi Ikeda family, also became a baron in 1891.
- His wife was Kinuko (born October 1856, death date unknown; second daughter of Ikeda Tansui). Heisei Shinshū Kyū-Kazoku Keifu Taisei lists two sons and three daughters.
- Eldest son: Nao (1889–1911).
- Second son: Tokutarō (June 1892 – 1945). After Kentarō's death, Tokutarō succeeded to the headship and the peerage. His wife was Shigeno (born July 1900, death date unknown), daughter of Kōmoto Naoichirō (1868–1924), vice-president of the Mimasaka Katsuyama Bank (later transferred to the Chugoku Bank). Through Kōmoto he was related to Yamatani Torazō. Their eldest son was Tadatoshi (born January 1926) and their eldest daughter was Miwako (born March 1927).
- Second daughter: Yasuko (born June 1880); see below.
- Third daughter: Mie (September 1884 – 1964). She married Migite Kantarō (engineer of the Ministry of Agriculture and head of the Japanese trading house in Cairo) and had children, but later divorced.

=== Yasuko ===
Yasuko married into the Yashirota family, wealthy landowners of Shōdoshima, but was divorced at the age of 21. After moving to Tokyo she remarried, on the introduction of Gakushuin professor Matsui Yasuzaburō, the engineer Ushiō Kōzō (born 1874; later a captain of naval shipbuilding and president of Nihon Kyūdō-sha). While Ushiō was away aboard the repair ship Kantō Maru, Yasuko enrolled in a women's college home-economics course and attended English classes taught by Hatano Harufusa, who had returned from the United States. The two became involved and married in 1908, and had a child. In 1911 she converted to Islam together with her father Kentarō and her husband Hatano.

Hatano later became intimate with his student Hatano Akiko and requested a divorce; Yasuko and Hatano divorced in 1913. Akiko married Hatano but died in 1923 in a double suicide with Arishima Takeo. In the ensuing press coverage Yasuko spoke candidly about how she had met Hatano and about the relationship between her former husband and Akiko, causing a stir. After the divorce she worked as a book saleswoman at Yamamiya Shoten in Kanda Ogawamachi. She later became the second wife of a businessman and is also said to have eloped with a German.
