= Shizutani School =

Coordinates: 34°47′53″N 134°13′10″E

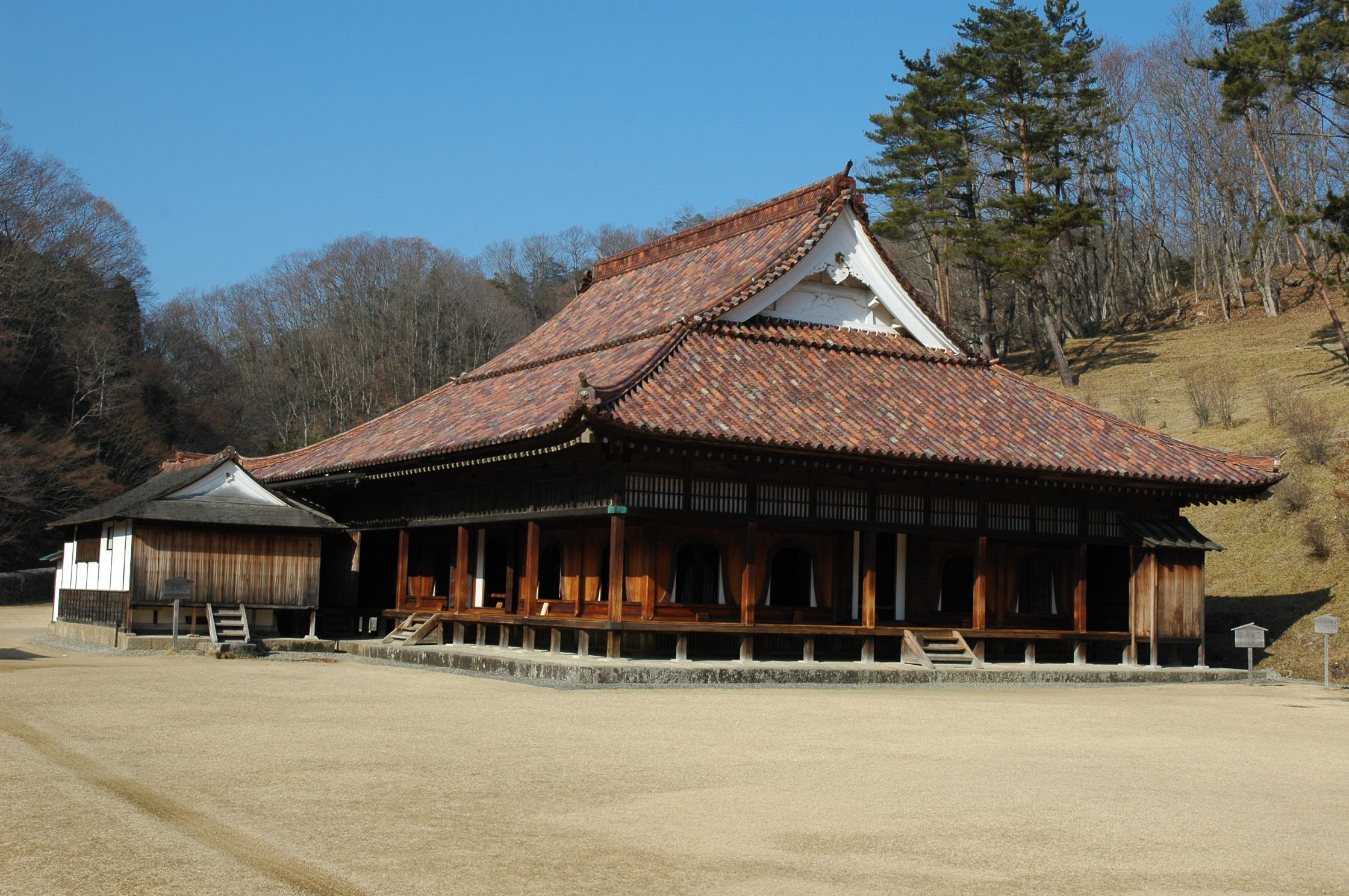
Shizutani School Auditorium (National Treasure)

The Shizutani School (閑谷学校, shizutani gakkō) was a school for the common people opened by the Okayama Domain in the early Edo period. It is located in Bizen in the Okayama Prefecture of Japan. The Auditorium (講堂, kōdō) has been designated by the Ministry of Education, Culture, Sports, Science and Technology of the government of Japan as National Treasures in the building/structure category.

== History ==
Shizutani school goes back to 1666 when Ikeda Mitsumasa, the feudal lord of the Bizen Area, made an inspection tour throughout the country and came across Kidani Village in Wake, which turned out to be provided with better conditions as a site of education than anywhere else. He then made up his mind to found a school there for the commoners. In 1670, after two years' trial, Tsuda Nagatada, his chief vassal, was set to the duty to complete the school. Since then, this place has been called "Shizu-tani" instead of Ki-dani, meaning "quiet and peaceful valley". Also, he put the fief he had in Kidani Village under the direct rule of the school, so that the school might support itself with what Kidani Villagers offer and pursue the cultural development concentratedly, free from politics, in case the Ikeda family should be shifted. The Lecture Hall was completed by Ikeda Tsunamasa (Mitsumasa's son), the Lord of Bizen Province, in 1701.

In that feudal age, there were few cases in which public schools were established by regional lords to educate the promising aristocratic bushi. It is a surprising thing that a school open to the public existed there. Ikeda is attributed with the idea, "Better public morality is all up to the education of the common people".

== Features ==
The first unique feature in Shizutani School is the roof made of Bizen Ware tiles. The top-rounded stone wall surrounds the school, stretching as long as 837 yards. The stone arrangement in the Chinese style is precious and harmonizes with the rest of the school. Building materials consist of wood from camphor, zelkova, and Japanese cypress trees, which were all selected with care. The main structures are lacquered in black or clear varnish. The lapse of three hundred years has added to the lecture hall floor its gradually accumulated luster.

Close examination reveals the structural care in its construction. The tiles of the roofs are put one over another in three layers so that rain would not leak through the ceiling in case the upper tiles break.

Each roof has a different symbol on its tiles. Those of the lecture hall have a "six leaves" crest, Shizutani Shrine's is the "Swallowtail" which, at one time symbolized the Ikeda clan, and the symbol on those of the Confucian mausoleum mean "Academic Freedom."

By the side of the lecture hall, there is a special room in which Lord Ikeda would rest when he visited the school. It is in the tearoom style and expresses the simple and sturdy spirit of Bushido.

== See also ==
- List of National Treasures of Japan (miscellaneous structures)
- List of Special Places of Scenic Beauty, Special Historic Sites and Special Natural Monuments
