= Mitsumasa =

- Gender: Male

Origin
- Origin: Japanese
- Meaning: Different meanings depending on the kanji used

Mitsumasa (written: 光政, 光正 or 光雅) is a masculine Japanese given name. Notable people with the name include:

- Mitsumasa Anno (安野 光雅) (born 1926), Japanese writer and illustrator
- Ikeda Mitsumasa (池田 光政) (1609–1682), Japanese daimyō
- Mitsumasa Yoda (依田 光正) (born 1977), Japanese footballer
- Mitsumasa Yonai (米内 光政) (1880–1948), Japanese admiral, politician and Prime Minister of Japan
