= Banzan =

Banzan may refer to:

- 10453 Banzan, a main-belt asteroid named after Kumazawa Banzan
- 30963 Mount Banzan, a Mars-crossing asteroid, named after the Japanese mountain
- Kumazawa Banzan (1619–1691), a Confucian scholar in the Edo period
- Mount Banzan, Japan, where the Sendai Astronomical Observatory is located
