= Okayama Domain Han School =

- 岡山藩藩学 (Japanese)
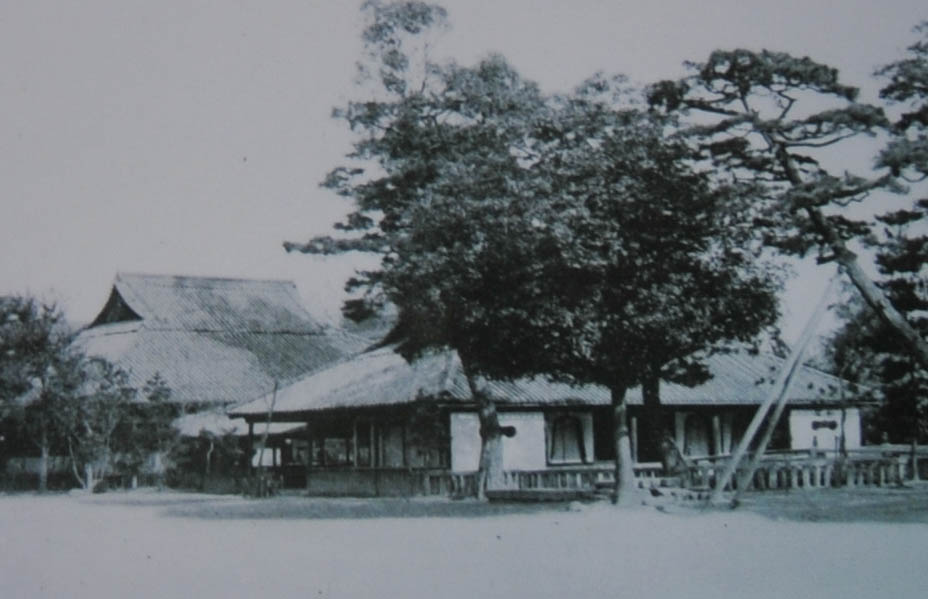
- Okayama Domain Han School before WWII

- Okayama Domain Han School Okayama Domain Han School (Japan)
- Interactive map of Okayama Domain Han School
- 34°40′2.9″N 133°55′38.3″E
- Type: Han school
- Periods: Edo period
- Location: Kita-ku, Okayama, Okayama Prefecture, Japan
- Region: San'yō region

Site notes
- Public access: Yes (no facilities)

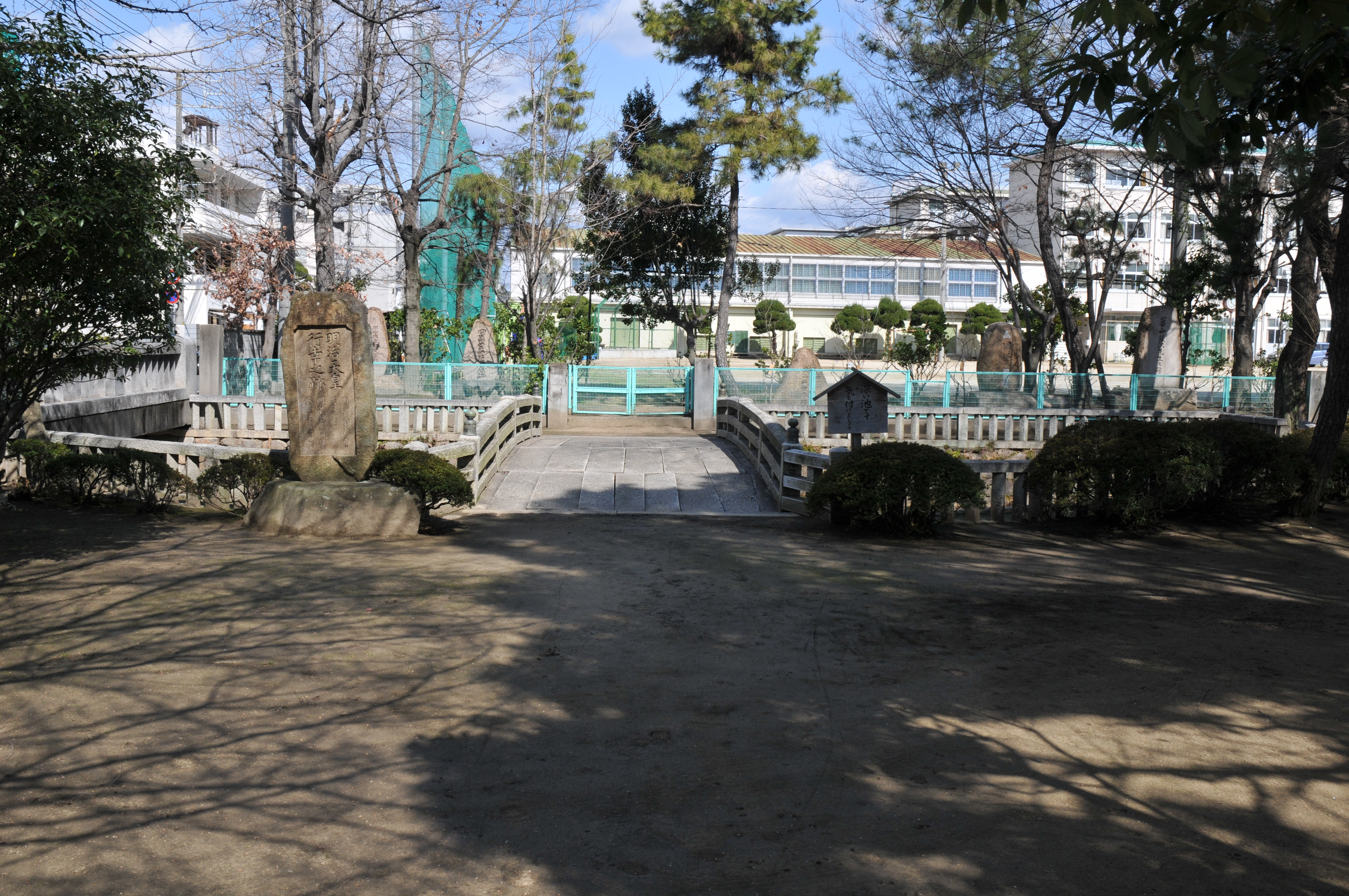
Present-day site of the Okayama Domain Han School

The Okayama Domain han School (岡山藩藩学) was a han school located in the Banzan neighborhood of Kita-ku, in Okayama, Okayama Prefecture. One of the oldest han schools to have been established, it was designated a National Historic Site in 1922.

== History ==
In 1669, Ikeda Mitsumasa, the daimyō of Okayama Domain, opened a domain academy in the castle town of Okayama. This was 21 years earlier than the famous Yushima Seidō academy which was opened in Edo by the Tokugawa shogunate. However, even prior to 1669, domain had created a han school called the Hanabatakekai (also known as the "Hanabatake Kojo") in 1641. The main purpose was to educate the children of his feudal retainers, but was also open to the children of wealthy commoners who were willing to a raised to lower samurai status. The precincts were initially the converted residence of Matsudaira Masatane within Okayama Castle, but later as the number of students increased, the school relocated its present site, which was originally the abandoned temple of Enjō-ji, and the site of a nearby samurai residence were used. Although Mitsumasa himself was an adherent of Yangmingism, the school mainly taught Edo neo-Confucianism of the Cheng–Zhu school, which was the orthodoxy promoted by the Tokugawa shogunate. The curriculum was primarily reading and reciting the Four Books and Five Classics, with martial arts training in between.

The school covered an area of 202 meters north-to-south by 111 meters east-to-west. Based on Confucian thought, the school buildings were arranged in an orderly and symmetrical manner. Buildings for literary studies were on the east side, and buildings for martial arts training on the west side. Around these school buildings, were a school magistrate's mansion, lecturer's dormitory, student dormitory and a 181.8-meter-long riding ground outside the west outer moat. The school initially had a capacity of 161 student and 67 attendants; however, the number fluctuated in accordance with Okayama Domain's finances over time. The quota was lowered to 63 students in 1683, but reached 242 students at its peak in then late Edo Period (1815-1842).

The school closed in 1871, and was later succeeded by the Okayama Prefectural Normal School and the Okayama Prefectural Women's Normal School. At the time of its designation as a National Historic Site in 1922, the south gate, main gate, and auditorium remained, but in 1945, these structures were destroyed in during an air raid. After the war, most of the site was reclaimed by urban encroachment, with a portion now occurred by the current Okayama Municipal Okayama Chuo Junior High School. Today, only the pond and the stone bridge that spans it remain.

The site is a three-minute walk from the Okayama Electric Tramway Higashiyama Main Line "Yanagawa" stop.

== See also ==
- List of Historic Sites of Japan (Okayama)
- History of education in Japan
