= Kumazawa Banzan =

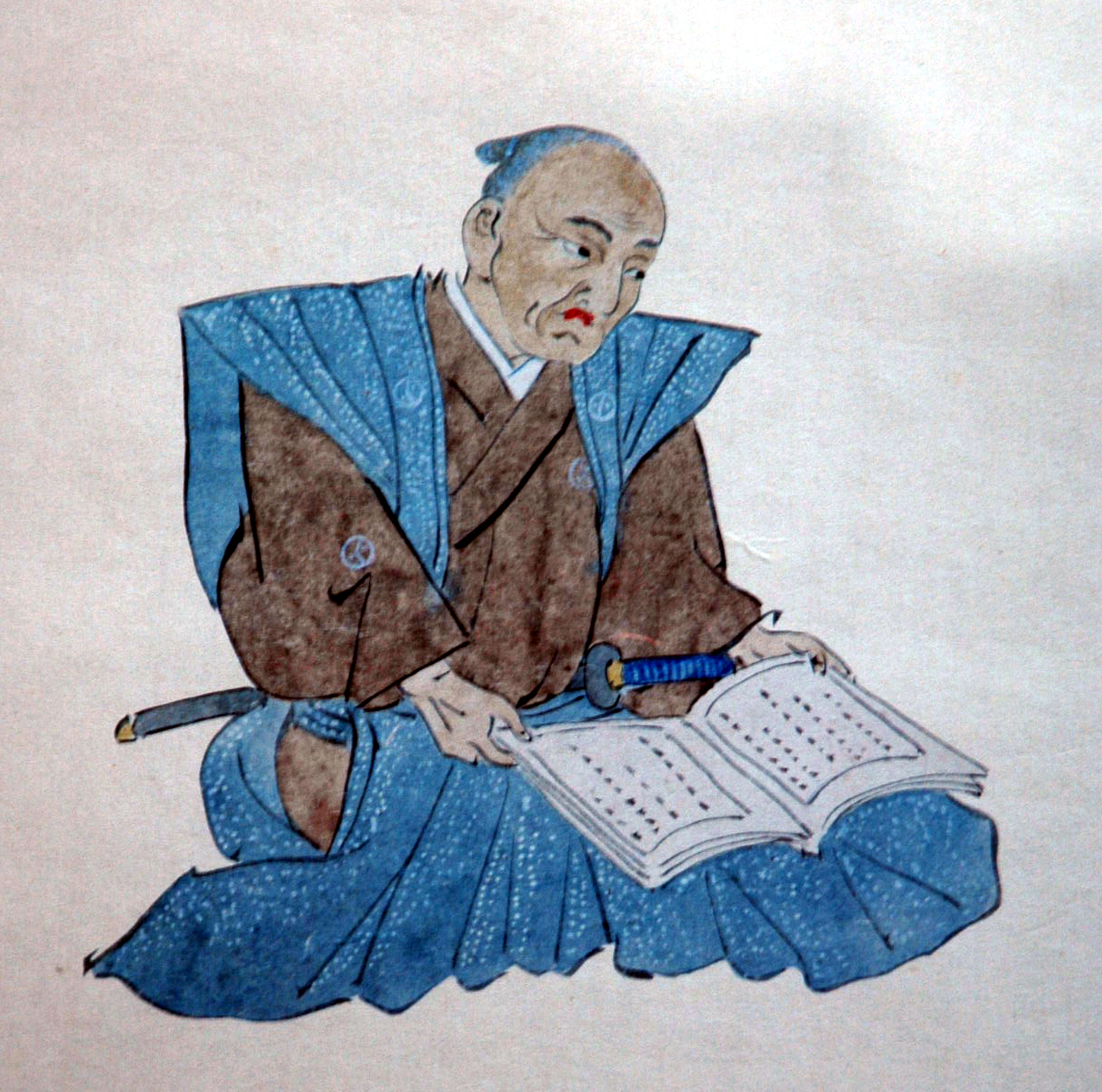
Kumazawa Banzan

Kumazawa Banzan (熊沢 蕃山, 1619 – September 9, 1691) was a Japanese Confucian. He learned Yangmingism from Nakae Tōju and served Ikeda Mitsumasa, the lord of Bizen Province. In his later years, he was imprisoned for writing Daigaku Wakumon, which contained criticism of Tokugawa shogunate politics.

== Name ==
His childhood name (yōmei) was Sashichirō (左七郞), his imina was Shigetsugu (伯継). His common name (azana) was Ryōsuke (either 了介 or 良介), and he was commonly known by the personal names (tsūshō) as Jirōhachi (次郎八) or Suke'emon (助右衛門). His most common courtesy name (gō) was Sokuyūken (息游軒). His surname "Kumazawa" (熊沢) was changed to that of "Shigeyama" (蕃山) in 1660 and the latter, read in Sino-Japanese as "Banzan", became his posthumous courtesy title, by which even now he is commonly known.

== Yōmeigaku ==
Yōmeigaku is the Japanese term for a school of Neo-Confucianism associated with its founder, the Chinese philosopher Wang Yangming, characterised by introspection and activism, and which exercised a profound influence on Japanese revisions of Confucian political and moral theory in Japan during the Edo period.

== Life ==
=== Early life ===
He was born in Kyoto Inari (now Shimogyō-ku, Kyoto), the eldest son of six children. His father, a rōnin, was called Nojiri Tōbei Kazutoshi (野尻藤兵衛一利) (1590–1680). He had served under two daimyō but was masterless at the time of Banzan’s birth. Banzan’s grandfather had served Oda Nobunaga (1534–1582) and Sakuma Jinkurô (1556–1631). His mother was called Kamejo (亀女) and was the daughter of a samurai named Kumazawa Morihisa (熊沢守久), a samurai serving the daimyo of Mito, Tokugawa Yorifusa. At the age of eight, Banzan was adopted by his maternal grandfather and took from him the surname of Kumazawa.

=== Leaving to study under Nakae Tōju ===
In 1634, through the introduction of Itakura Shigemasa (板倉重昌), a fudai vassal of the Tokugawa, he went to serve as a page under Ikeda Mitsumasa (池田光政), the daimyo of the Okayama Domain in Bizen Province. He left the Ikeda household for a time, returning to his grandfather's home in Kirihara, Ōmi Province (now Ōmihachiman).

=== Time in the Okayama Domain ===
In 1645, again with the recommendation of the Kyōgoku family, he went to work in the Okayama Domain. As Mitsumasa's thinking leaned towards Yōmeigaku, he made much use of Banzan, valuing him for having studied under Tōju. Banzan worked mainly in the Han school called Hanabatake Kyōjō (花畠教場), whose name means "Flowerfield Teaching Place". This school opened in 1641, making it one of the first in Japan. In 1647 Banzan became an aide, with an entitlement (知行) of 300 koku. In 1649 he went with Mitsumasa to Edo.

In 1650, he was promoted to be the head of a group of artillery men (鉄砲組). In 1651, he drafted the regulations for a Hanazonokai? (花園会), literally "flower garden club", a place for the education of common people. This was the initial incarnation of the first school in Japan for educating commoners, Shizutani Gakkō (閑谷学校) which opened in 1670, after Banzan had left the service of his domain. In 1654, when the Bizen plains were assailed by floods and large-scale famine, he put all his energies into assisting Mitsumasa with relief efforts. Together with Tsuda Nagatada (津田永忠), he worked as an aide to Mitsumasa, helping to establish the start of a domain government in Okayama Domain. He worked to produce fully developed strategies on agriculture, including ways of providing relief to small-scale farmers and land engineering projects to manage mountains and rivers. However, his daring reforms of domain government brought him into opposition with the traditionalist elders (家老, karō). In addition, while Banzan was a follower of Yōmeigaku, the official philosophy of the Edo shogunate was a different form of Neo-Confucianism, Shushigaku (朱子学). Banzan was criticised by figures such as Hoshina Masayuki (保科正之) and Hayashi Razan (林羅山). In fact, Banzan was the first in a series of notable neo-Confucianists who would find themselves confronting the evolving critical powers of the Hayashi clan of scholars.

For this reason, Banzan was left with no choice but to leave the service of Okayama Castle and live in hiding in Shigeyama-mura (蕃山村), Wake District (now Shigeyama, Bizen, Okayama). The name "Banzan" derives from the word "Shigeyama". The location where his home was is Banzan-chō (蕃山町), Okayama-shi.

=== Time out of power and later life ===
Eventually, in 1657, unable to withstand the pressure from the shogunate and the domain leaders, he left Okayama Domain.

In 1658, he moved to Kyoto and opened a private juku (school). In 1660, at the request of Nakagawa Hisakiyo (中川久清), he travelled to Tateda, Oita, and gave directions on land management. In 1661, his fame grew, and he again came to be under the surveillance of the shogunate, and was eventually driven out of Kyoto by Makino Chikashige (牧野親成), aide to the head of the Kyoto Shoshidai (京都所司代).

In 1667, he escaped to Yoshinoyama, Yamato Province (now Yoshino, Nara). He then moved to live in hiding in Kaseyama (鹿背山), Yamashiro Province (now Kizugawa, Kyoto). In 1669, on orders from the shogunate, he was put under the control of Matsudaira Nobuyuki (松平信之), the head of the Akashi Domain (明石藩), Harima Province. In 1683, as Nobuyuki was transferred to Kōriyama Province, he moved to Yatayama (矢田山), Yamato Province (now Yamatokōriyama, Nara). In 1683, he received the invitation of the tairō (大老) Hotta Masatoshi (堀田正俊), but refused it. After serving the Okayama District, in his days outside public service, he often wrote, and criticised the policies of the shogunate, particularly sankin-kōtai (参勤交代), Heinō Bunri (兵農分離) (the policy forbidding those outside the samurai class to arm themselves), and the hereditary system. He was also critical of the government of Okayama Domain.

Banzan's goal was to reform the Japanese government by advocating the adoption of a political system based on merit rather than heredity and the employment of political principles to reinforce the merit system.

In 1687, he was put under the control of Matsudaira Tadayuki (松平忠之), head of Koga Domain (古河藩), Shimousa Province (下総国), and heir to Matsudaira Nobuyuki, and ordered to remain inside Koga Castle. In 1691 the rebellious Confucian became ill and died within Koga Castle at the age of 74.

=== After his death ===
Banzan's remains were buried by Tadayuki with much ceremony at Keienji (鮭延寺), in Ōtsutsumi (大堤), Koga, Ibaraki. The initial inscription on the tombstone was "grave of Sokuyūken" (息游軒墓), using his posthumous name, but this was later changed to "grave of Kumazawa Sokuyūken Hatsukei" (熊沢息游軒伯継墓).

In the Bakumatsu period, Banzan's philosophy came back into the spotlight, greatly influencing the structure of government. It was favoured by, among others, Fujita Tōko (藤田東湖) and Yoshida Shōin (吉田松陰), becoming a motivating force in the toppling of the shogunate government. Katsu Kaishū praised Banzan as "a hero in Confucian robes".

Outside the realm of politics, Banzan would in time become something of a cultural hero because, while attending to actions and words which demonstrated an enduring concern for commoners and the poor. He was praised for resistance to the imposition of corrupt politics and bureaucratic burdens on ordinary people.

In 1910, the Meiji government honoured Banzan with the title of Upper Fourth Rank (正四位), in recognition of his contribution to the development of learning in the Edo period.

== Writings ==
- Shūgi Washo (集義和書)
- Shūgi Gaisho (集義外書)
- Daigaku Wakumon (大学或問)

== Lineage ==
- Nojiri family (野尻氏)

Shōgen (将監) — Kyūbē Shigemasa (久兵衛重政) — Tōbei Kazutoshi (藤兵衛一利) — Banzan

- Kumazawa family (熊沢氏)

Shinsaemon Hiroyuki (新左衛門廣幸) — Yasaemon Hirotsugu (八左衛門廣次) — Heisaburō Moritsugu (平三郎守次) — Hansaemon Morihisa (半右衛門守久) — Kamejo (亀女) — Banzan

=== See also ===
- Kobe temple -- Taisanji (太山寺)
- List of Confucianists

== Sources ==
- Collins, Randall. (1998). The Sociology of Philosophies: A Global Theory of Intellectual Change. Cambridge: Harvard University Press. ISBN 978-0-674-81647-3 (cloth) ISBN 978-0-674-00187-9 (paper)
- McMullen, James. (1999). Idealism, Protest and the Tale of Genji: The Confucianism of Kumazawa Banzan (1619-91). Oxford: Oxford University Press. ISBN 978-0-19-815251-4 (cloth)
- Najita, Tetsuo. (1980). Japan: The Intellectual Foundations of Modern Japanese Politics. Chicago: University of Chicago Press. ISBN 978-0-226-56803-4
- Vaporis, Constantine Nomikos. (2019). Samurai. An Encyclopedia of Japan’s Cultured Warriors. Santa Barbara, California: ABC-Clio, ISBN 978-1-4408-4270-2
