= Ikeda clan =

Japanese clan

Ikeda 池田
- The emblem (mon) of the Minokuni branch of the Ikeda clan
- Home province: Tottori Domain; Okayama Domain
- Parent house: Seiwa Genji
- Titles: Various
- Founder: Ikeda Yasumasa
- Current head: Atsuko Ikeda
- Dissolution: still extant

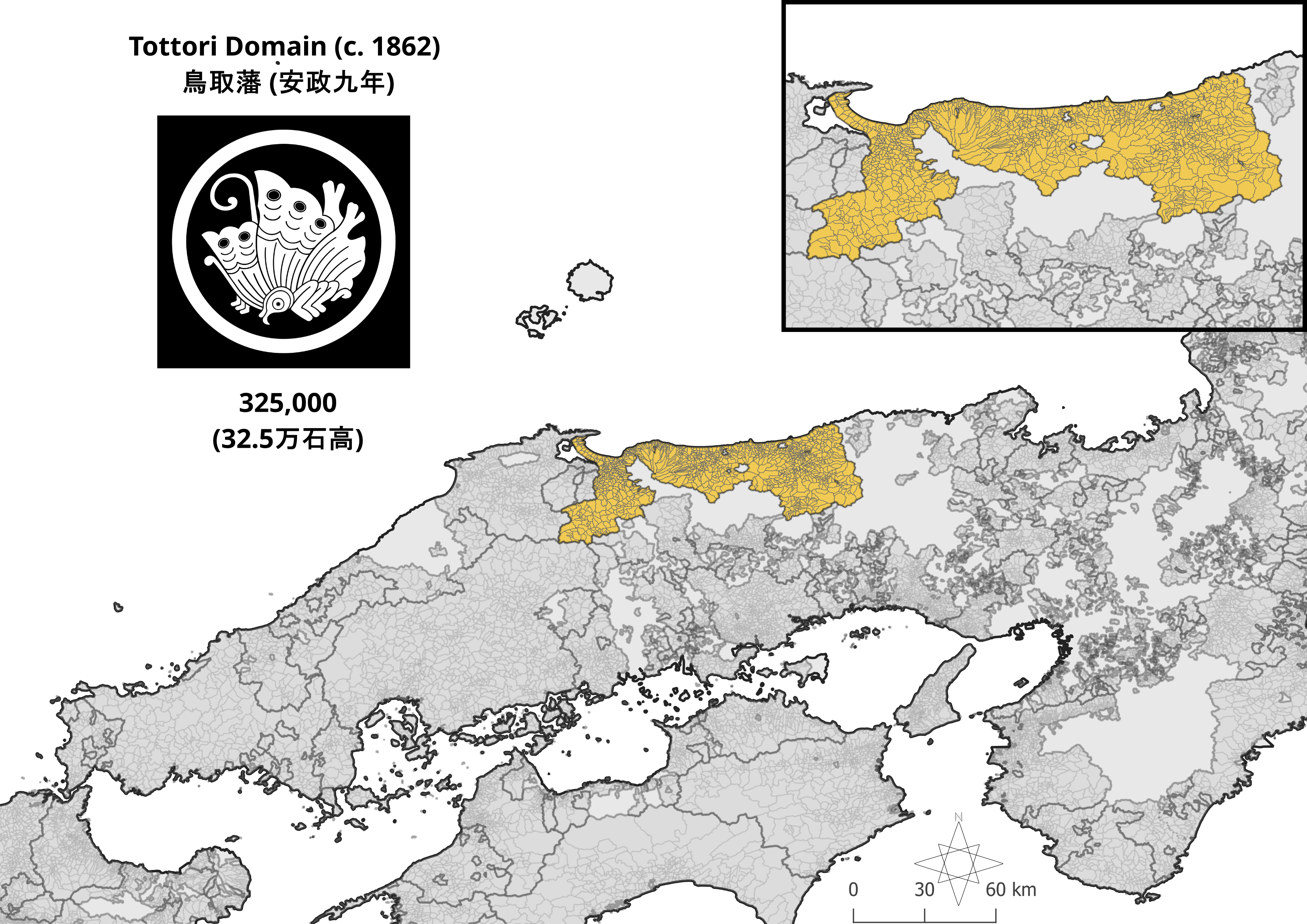
Map of Tottori Domain c. 1862

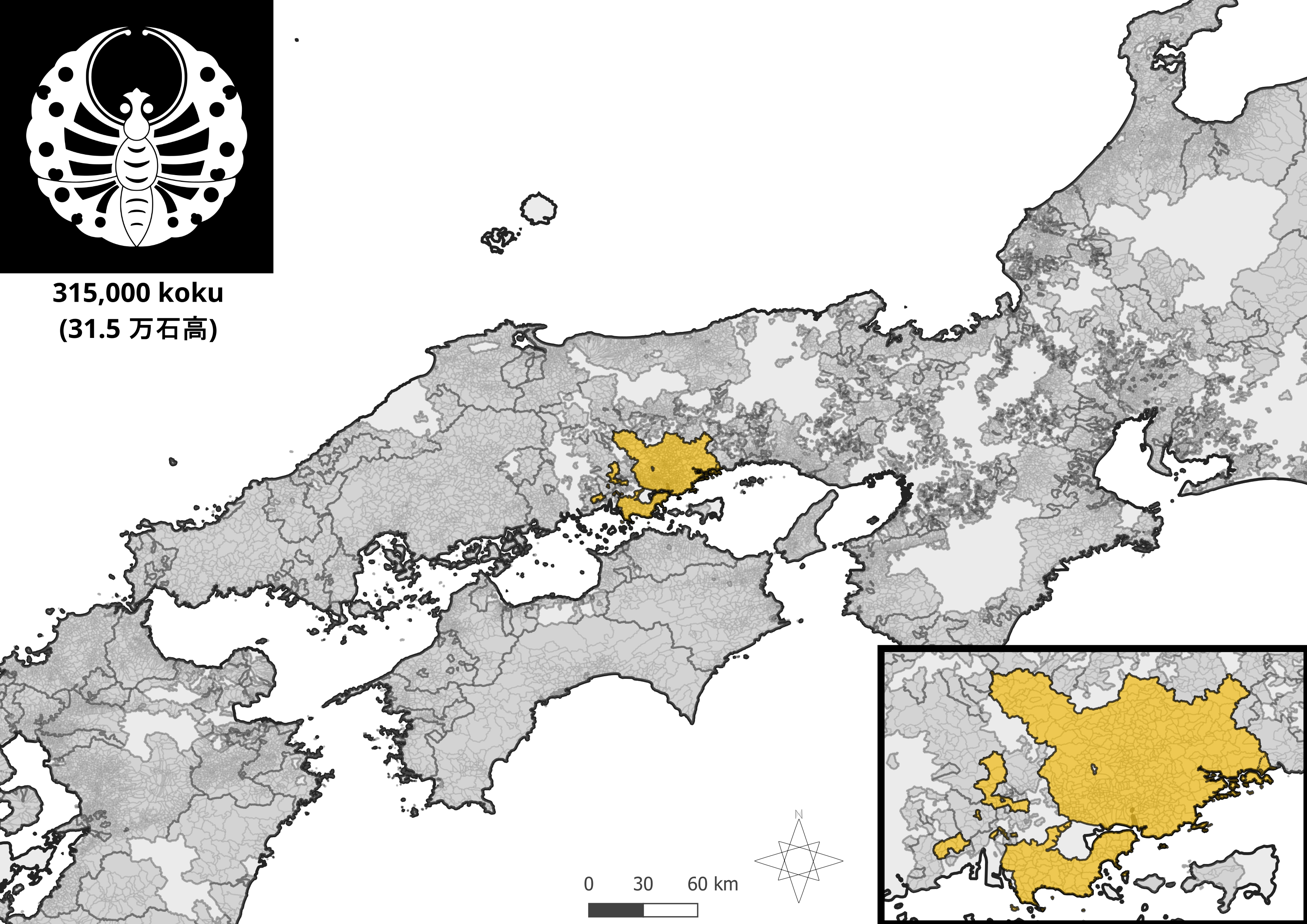
The territory and kokudaku of the Okayama domain at the end of the Edo period.

Ikeda clan (Japanese: 池田氏, Hepburn: Ikeda-shi) was a Japanese clan that claimed descent from Minamoto no Yorimitsu (948-1021) of the Seiwa Genji. Minamoto no Yasumasa, the fourth generation descending from Yorimitsu, and younger brother of Minamoto no Yorimasa (1104-1180), was the first to call himself 'Ikeda'.

In the Edo period, several of the clan's branches were daimyō families, most notably of the Tottori Domain and Okayama Domain. Takamasa Ikeda, former head of the Okayama Ikeda house was the husband of Atsuko Ikeda, fourth daughter of Emperor Shōwa. Inryoji Temple was built during the reign of Ikeda Tadakatsu.

== Settsu-Ikeda family ==
Settsu-Ikeda branch Mon (emblem)

1. Ikeda Korezane
2. Ikeda Koremochi
3. Ikeda Koresada
4. Ikeda Kimisada
5. Ikeda Yasusada
6. Ikeda Yasumasa
7. Ikeda Yasumitsu
8. Ikeda Yasunaga
9. Ikeda Yasutsugu
10. Ikeda Yasutada
11. Ikeda Kagemasa
12. Ikeda Noriyori
13. Ikeda Norimasa
14. Ikeda Kazumasa
15. Ikeda Iemasa
16. Ikeda Mitsumasa
17. Ikeda Sadamasa
18. Ikeda Nobumasa (d.1548)
19. Ikeda Nagamasa (d.1563)
20. Ikeda Katsumasa (1530/1539-1578)
21. Ikeda Tomomasa (1555-1604)
22. Ikeda Sankuro (1589-1605)
23. Ikeda Mitsushige (d.1628)
24. Ikeda Mitsunaga
25. Ikeda Sadanaga
26. Ikeda Sadashige
27. Ikeda Akisada
28. Ikeda Sadahiko
29. Ikeda Sadao
30. Ikeda Sadakazu
31. Ikeda Sadamizu
32. Ikeda Tonemune

== Mino-Ikeda family ==
Mino-Ikeda family crest

1. Ikeda Tsunetoshi (d.1538)
2. Ikeda Tsuneoki
3. Ikeda Terumasa
4. Ikeda Toshitaka (1584-1616)
5. Ikeda Tadakatsu
6. Ikeda Mitsumasa
7. Ikeda Tsunamasa
8. Ikeda Tsugumasa
9. Ikeda Munemasa
10. Ikeda Harumasa (1750-1819)
11. Ikeda Narimasa (1773-1833)
12. Ikeda Naritoshi (1811-1842)
13. Ikeda Yoshimasa (1823-1893)
14. Ikeda Mochimasa (1839-1899)
15. Ikeda Akimasa (1836-1903)
16. Ikeda Norimasa (1866-1909)
17. Ikeda Tadamasa (1895-1920)
18. Ikeda Nobumasa (1904-1988)
19. Ikeda Takamasa (1926-2012)

== Known members of the Ikeda clan ==
- Yōtoku-in (養徳院), was the wet nurse (foster mother) of Oda Nobunaga.
- Ikeda Sen (Senhime)
- Ikeda Tsuneoki (1536 – May 18, 1584)
- Ikeda Terumasa (January 31, 1565 – March 16, 1613)
- Ikeda Mitsumasa (May 10, 1609 – June 27, 1682)
- Ikeda Tsunamasa (February 18, 1638 – December 5, 1714)
- Ikeda Munemasa (1727–1764)
- Atsuko Ikeda (b. 7 March 1931)
