= Ikeda Munemasa =

- 池田宗政
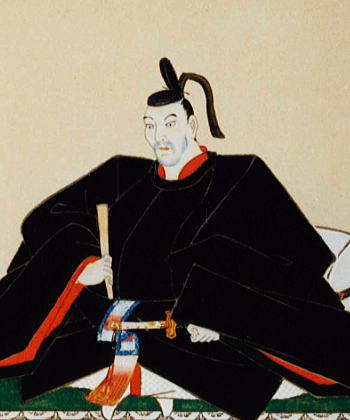
- Portrait from the Hayashibara Museum of Art

Daimyō
- Preceded by: Ikeda Tsugumasa

Personal details
- Born: June 1727
- Died: March 10, 1764 (aged 36–37)

Ikeda Munemasa (池田宗政) (June 1727 - March 10, 1764) was a daimyō of Iyo Province in the Edo period of Japan. He was the 4th Lord of the Okayama Domain and head of the Ikeda clan. Ikeda's reign began in 1752, following the retirement of his father, Ikeda Tsugumasa, and lasted until his death in 1764. He was lord of Okayama Castle. His childhood name was Shigetaro (茂太郎) later Minechiyo (峯千代).

He authored Portrait of Hitomaro and His Waka Poem, on the subject of the waka poet Kakinomoto no Hitomaro. He was skilled at calligraphy, haikai, painting and waka.

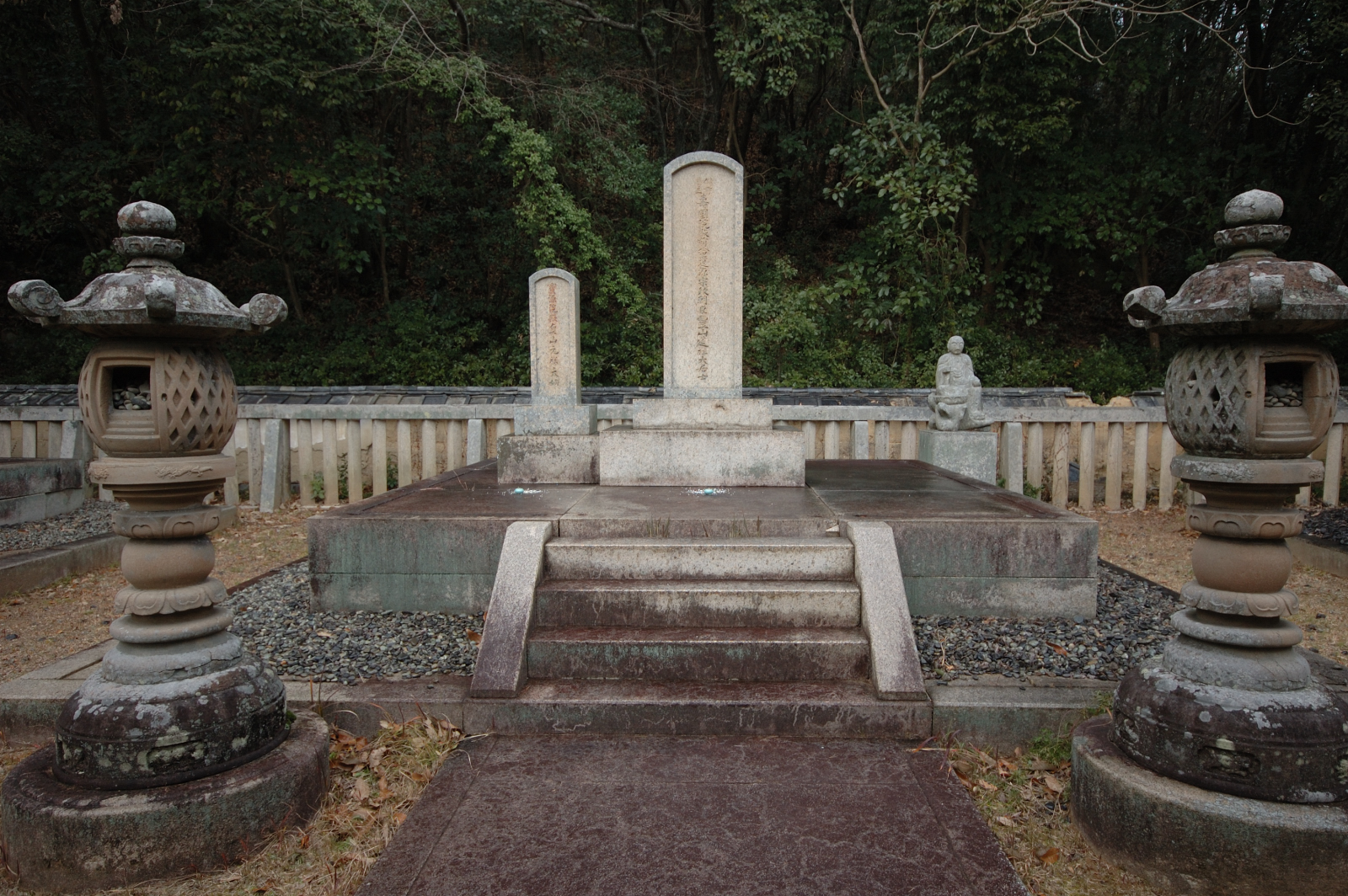
Ikeda's gravesite at the Sogenji temple in Okayama.

== Family ==
- Father: Ikeda Tsugumasa
- Mother: Kazuhime
- Wife: Kuroda Fujiko
- Children
  - Ikeda Harumasa (1750-1819) by Kuroda Fujiko
  - Sagara Nagahiro (1752-1813) by Kuroda Fujiko
  - Daughter married Sakakibara Masaatsu by Kuroda Fujiko
