= Tottori Domain =

Administrative division in western Japan during the Edo period (1600-1871)

Tottori Domain 鳥取藩
- Domain of Japan
- 1600–1871
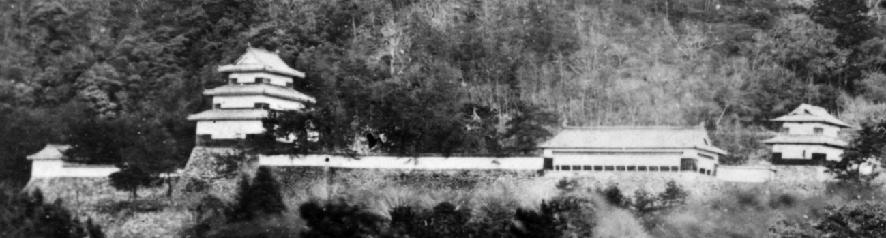
- Tottori Castle in Tottori, Tottori before 1873

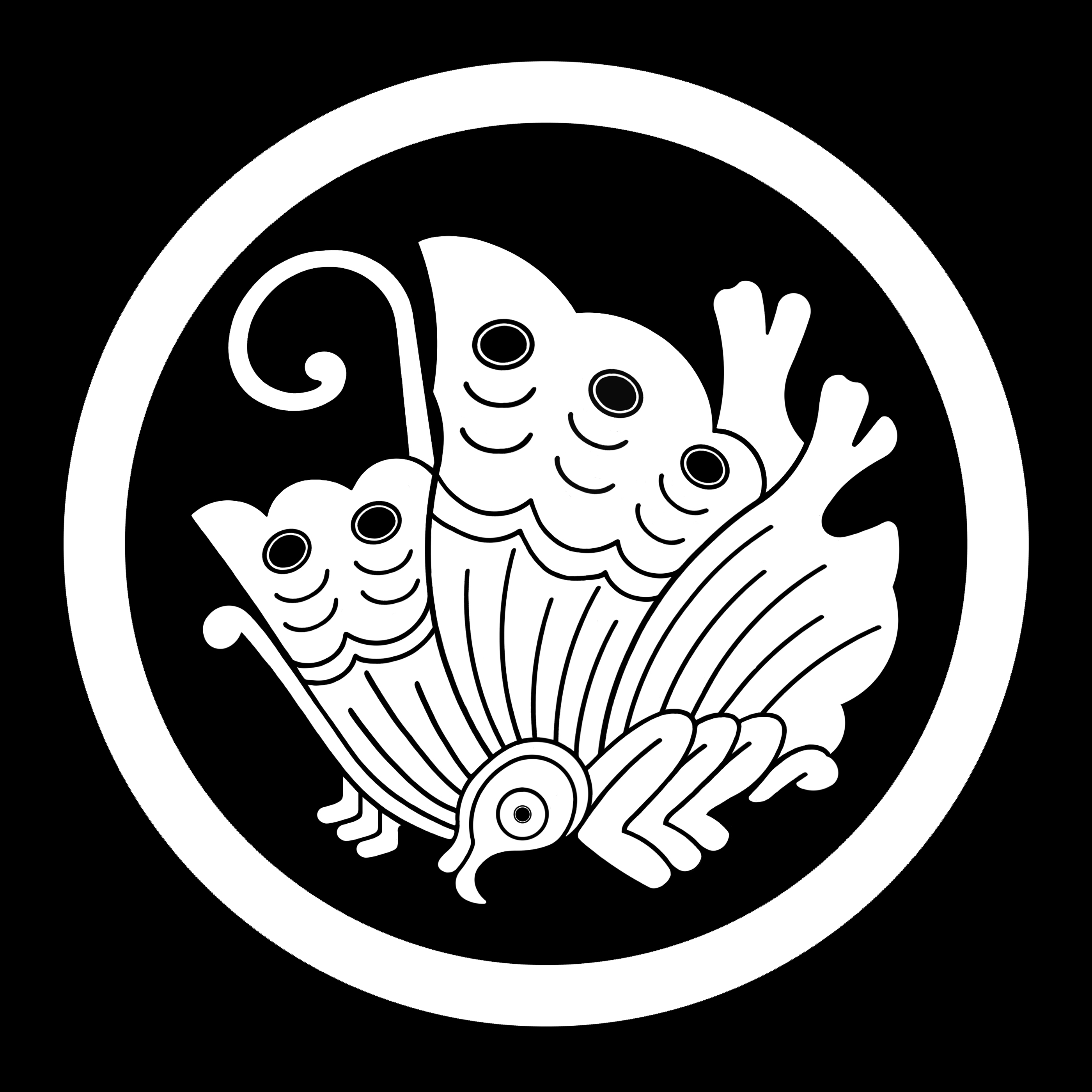
- Mon of the Ikeda clan
- Capital: Tottori Castle
- Area
  - Coordinates: 35°30′26.73″N 134°14′24.0″E
- Historical era: Edo period
  - Established: 1600
  - Abolition of the han system: 1871
- Contained within
  - Province: Inaba and Hōki
- Today part of: Tottori Prefecture

Location of Tottori Castle
Tottori Domain (Japan)

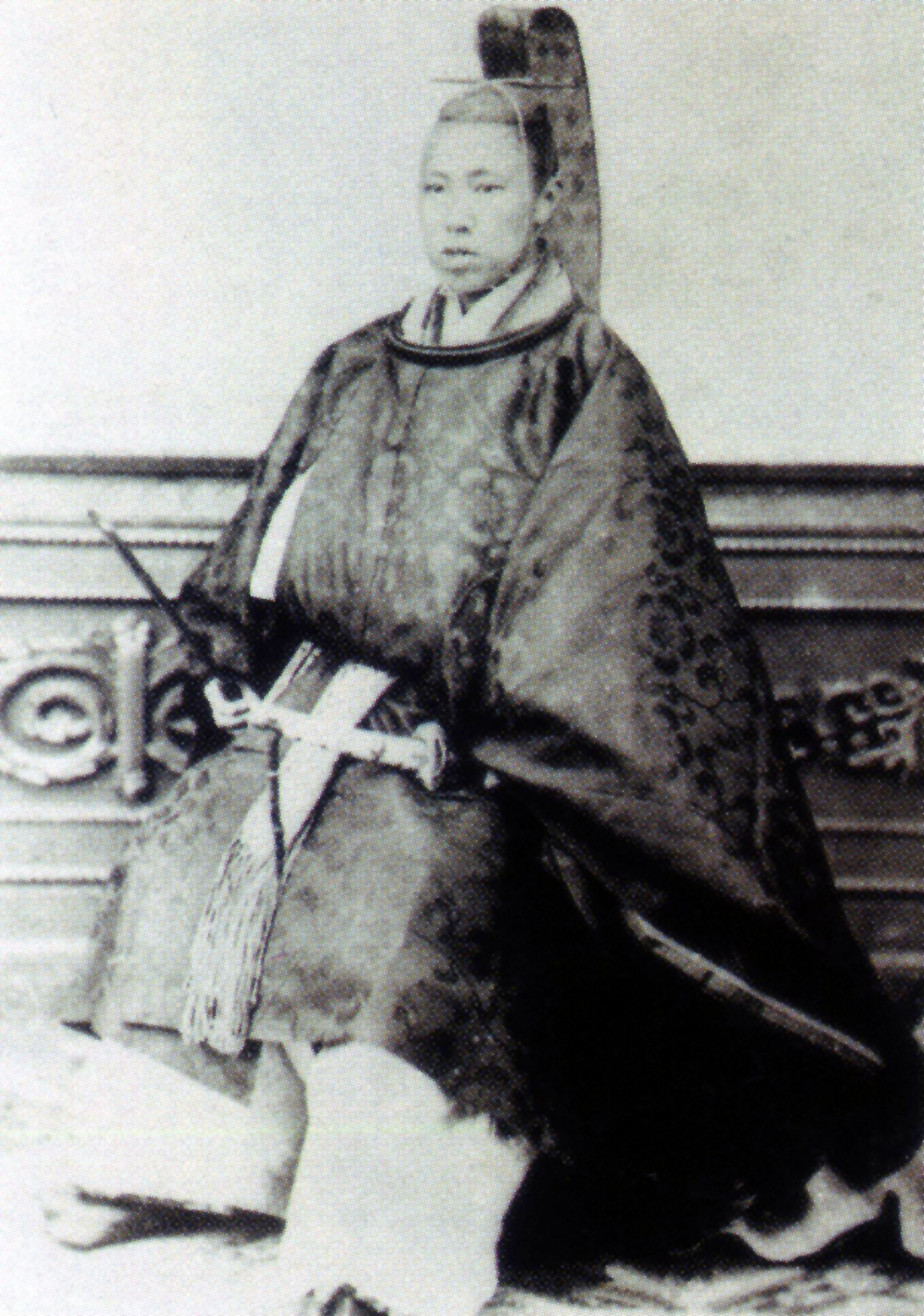
Ikeda Yoshinori

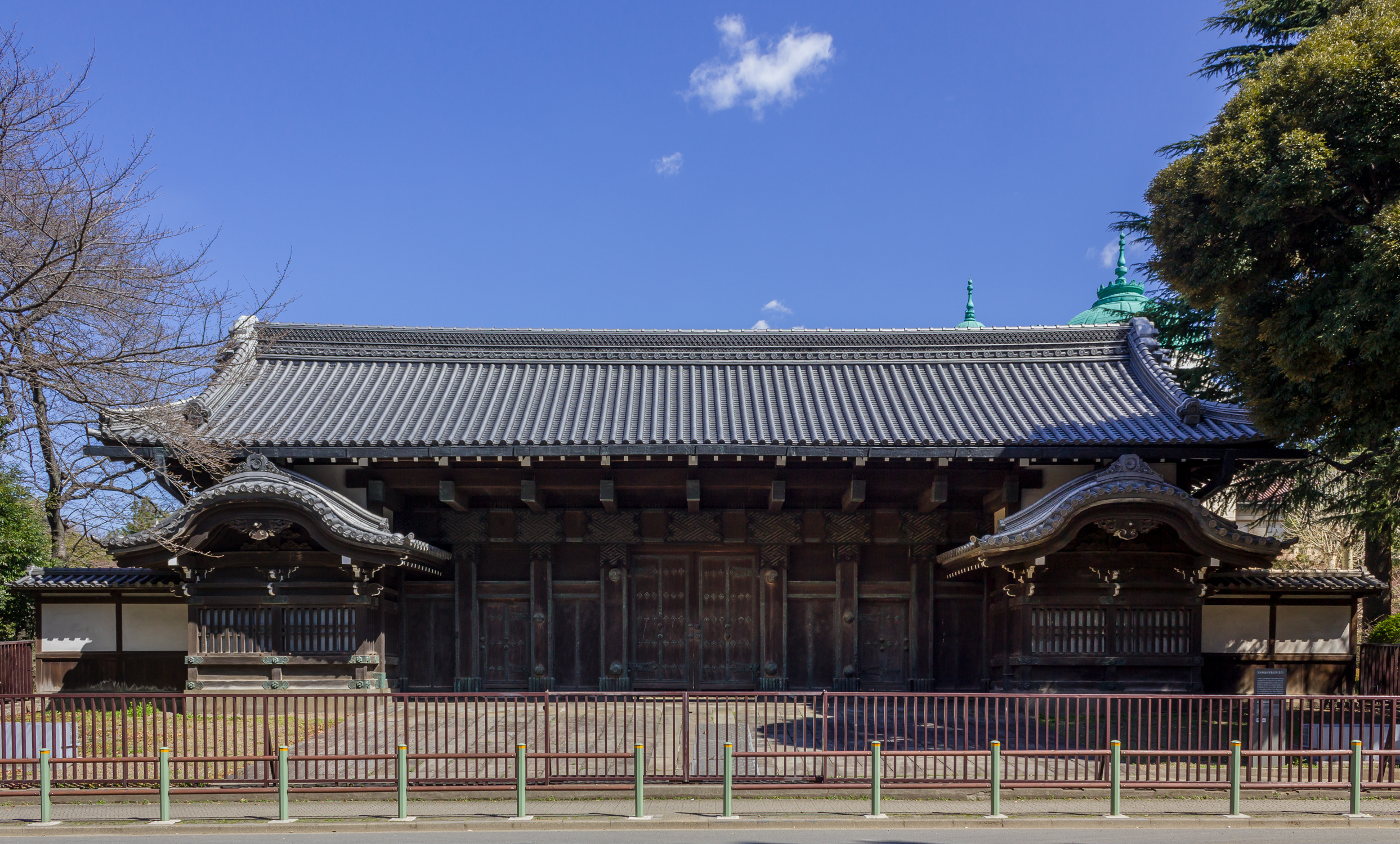
Front gate of the Tottori Domain residence in Edo

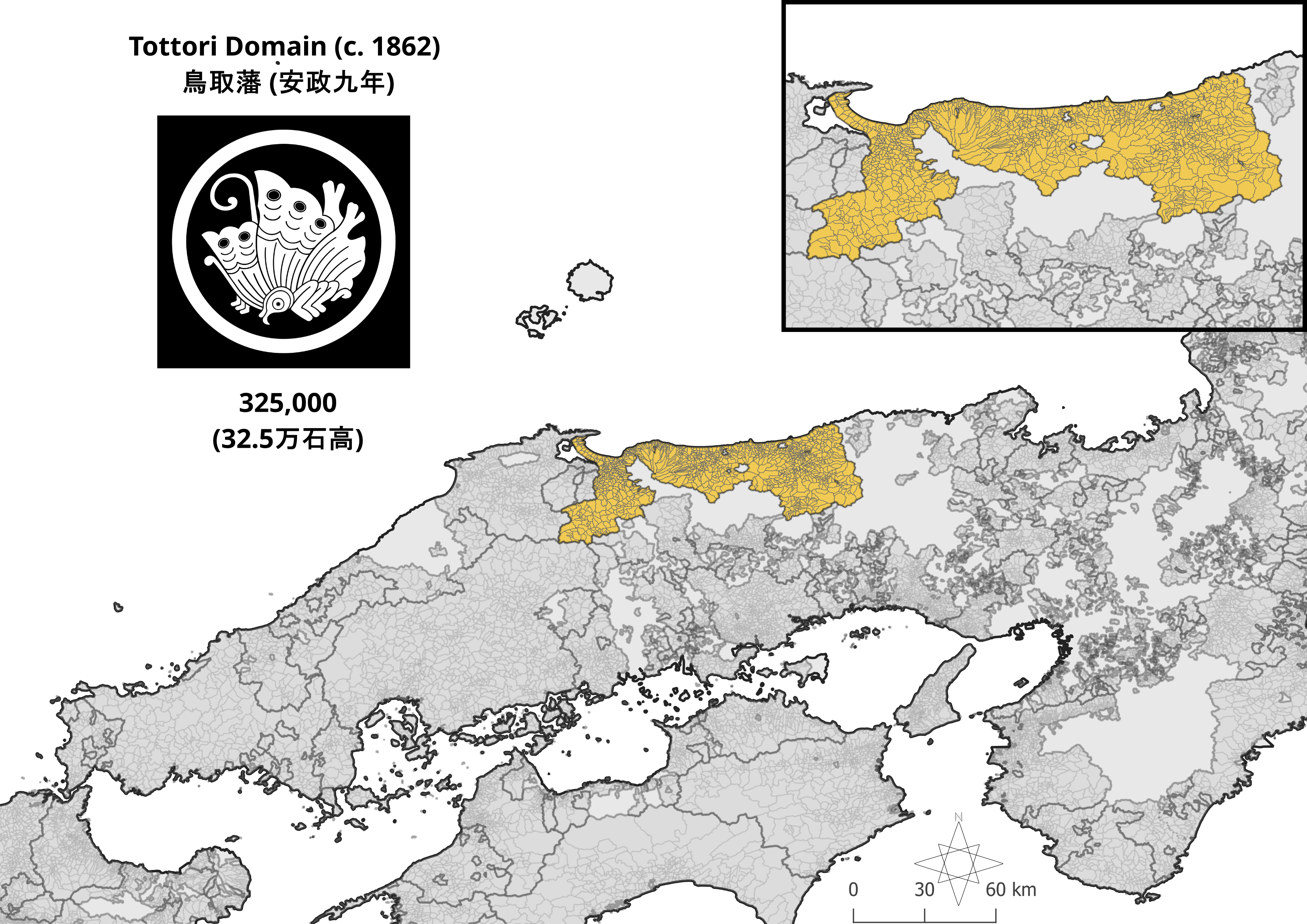
Map of Tottori Domain c. 1862

Tottori Domain (鳥取藩, Tottori-han) was a feudal domain under the Tokugawa shogunate of Edo period Japan, in what is now Tottori Prefecture on the island of Honshu. It controlled all of Inaba Province and virtually all of Hōki Province was centered around Tottori Castle, and was ruled throughout its history by a branch of the Ikeda clan. Tottori Domain was dissolved in the abolition of the han system in 1871 and is now part of Tottori Prefecture. Tottori Domain had two sub-domains, Shikano Domain (鹿奴藩) and Wakasa Domain (若桜藩). In addition, the two branches of the Arao clan, who served as hereditary karō of the clan and castellans of Yonago Castle (15,000 koku) and Kurayoshi Jin'ya (12,000 koku) both had kokudaka equivalents to that of daimyō.

== History ==
In 1600, after the Battle of Sekigahara, Ikeda Tsuneoki's third son, Ikeda Nagayoshi (Ikeda Terumasa's younger brother) was awarded estates in Hōki Province with a kokudaka of 60,000 koku by Tokugawa Ieyasu. This marked the start of Tottori Domain. In 1615, his son Ikeda Nagayoshi (長幸) was transferred to Bitchū-Matsuyama Domain, and in his place, Ikeda Mitsumasa (the eldest son of Ikeda Toshitaka, the son of Ikeda Terumasa) was transferred from Himeji Domain to an expanded Tottori Domain (325,000 koku) which now included most of Inaba Province as well as Hōki Province. During his 16 year tenure, he built the foundations of the castle town of Tottori.

In 1632, when his uncle Ikeda Tadao, of Okayama Domain died, Mitsumasa exchanged Tottori for Okayama and the clan chieftaincy. Ikeda Tadao's son, Ikeda Mitsunaka became daimyō of Tottori at the age of two, and his descendants would continue to rule the domain to the end of the Edo period. Although the Ikeda clan of Tottori was reduced to a branch of the clan, it was Ikeda Tadao's lineage which was in direct descent from Ikeda Terumasa and Tokugawa Ieyasu's second daughter, Tokuhime, so the Ikeda clan of Tottori was regarded by the Tokugawa shogunate as a kunimochi daimyō clan independent of the head of the Ikeda family of Okayama Domain. In addition to being allowed to use the honorific surname "Matsudaira", the Tottori Ikeda were also allowed the use of the Tokugawa family crest, as well as being formally recognized as Tokugawa relatives (shinpan. Normally, when a daimyō entered Edo Castle, he had to leave his sword with a retainer in front of the entrance. In addition to the Tottori Ikeda family, the privilege of retaining one's sword was granted only to the Kaga-Maeda clan and the Tokugawa clan's closest relations, which were the Tottori-Ikeda clan, the Aizu-Matsudaira clan, and the Echizen-Matsudaira clan.

The domain maintained a secondary castle at Yonago, and jin'ya in other important towns within the domain, such as Kurayoshi, Yahashi, Matsuzaki, and Uradome. The domain suffered greatly from the Tenpō famine from 1833 to 1837.

During the Bakumatsu period, the 12th daimyō, Ikeda Yoshinori, was the older brother of the 15th Shogun, Tokugawa Yoshinobu and had a difficult position between loyalty to the shogunate and the growing forces for the Meiji restoration. Within the domain, conflicts between the loyalists and the pro-Tokugawa factions were intense, and in 1863, an assassination of a senior vassal of the pro-shogunate faction occurred at Honkoku-ji in Kyoto. In the following year, when Chōshū Domain, with which he had a close relationship, was defeated in the Kinmon Incident and was declared enemy of the crown, he began to distance himself from politics, but in the Battle of Toba-Fushimi in 1868 and the Boshin War, he was on the side of the Meiji government army. As a result, he led the clan's forces in various battles. He was awarded 30,000 koku by the new Meiji government. The domain became part of Tottori Prefecture with the abolition of the han system in 1871. Ikeda Terutomo, the 15th chieftain of the clan, was made a marquis in the kazoku peerage in 1884.

== Holdings at the end of the Edo period ==
As with most domains in the han system, Tottori Domain consisted of several discontinuous territories calculated to provide the assigned kokudaka, based on periodic cadastral surveys and projected agricultural yields.

- Inaba Province (entire province)
  - 51 villages in Iwai District
  - 60 villages in Hōmi District
  - 89 villages in Hattō District
  - 63 villages in Yakami District
  - 98 villages in Chizu District
  - 35 villages in Ōmi District
  - 82 villages in Takakusa District
  - 83 villages in Keta District
- Hōki Province
  - 114 villages in Kawamura District
  - 120 villages in Kume District
  - 107 villages in Yabase District
  - 185 villages in Aimi District
  - 65 villages in Aseri District
  - 170 villages in Hino District
- Musashi Province
  - 1 village in Chichibu District

== List of daimyō ==
#	Name	Tenure	Courtesy title	Court Rank	kokudaka
Ikeda clan, 1600-1617 (Tozama)
1	Ikeda Nagayoshi (池田長吉)	1600 - 1614	Bitchū-no-kami (備中守)	Junior 5th Rank, Lower Grade (従五位下)	60,000 koku
2	Ikeda Nagayoshi (池田長幸)	1614 - 1617	Bitchū-no-kami (備中守)	Junior 5th Rank, Lower Grade (従五位下)	60,000 koku
Ikeda clan, 1617-1632 (Tozama)
1	Ikeda Mitsumasa (池田光政)	1614 - 1632	Sakon'e-gon-shōshō (左近衛権少将)	Junior 4th Rank, Lower Grade (従四位下)	320,000 koku
Tottori-Ikeda clan, 1632-1871 (Tozama, but equivalent to Shinpan)
1	Ikeda Mitsunaka (池田光仲)	1632 - 1685	Sakon'e-no-shōshō (左近衛少将)	Junior 4th Rank, Lower Grade (従四位下)	325,000 koku
2	Ikeda Tsunekiyo (池田綱清)	1685 - 1700	Hōki-no-kami (伯耆守); Sakon'e-no-shōshō (左近衛少将)	Junior 4th Rank, Lower Grade (従四位下)	325,000 koku
3	Ikeda Yoshiyasu (池田吉泰)	1700 - 1739	Sagami-no-kami (相模守); Jijū (侍従)	Junior 4th Rank, Lower Grade (従四位下)	325,000 koku
4	Ikeda Muneyasu (池田宗泰)	1739 - 1747	Sagami-no-kami (相模守); Jijū (侍従)	Junior 4th Rank, Lower Grade (従四位下)	325,000 koku
5	Ikeda Shigenobu (池田重寛)	1747 - 1783	Sagami-no-kami (相模守); Sakon'e-no-shōshō (左近衛少将)	Junior 4th Rank, Lower Grade (従四位下)	325,000 koku
6	Ikeda Harumichi (池田治道)	1783 - 1798	Sagami-no-kami (相模守); Jijū (侍従)	Junior 4th Rank, Lower Grade (従四位下)	325,000 koku
7	Ikeda Narikuni (池田斉邦)	1798 - 1807	Sagami-no-kami (相模守); Jijū (侍従)	Junior 4th Rank, Lower Grade (従四位下)	325,000 koku
8	Ikeda Naritoshi (池田斉稷)	1807 - 1830	Sagami-no-kami (相模守); Sakon'e-no-chūshō (左近衛中将)	Junior 4th Rank, Upper Grade (従四位上)	325,000 koku
9	Ikeda Narimichi (池田斉訓)	1830 - 1841	Sagami-no-kami (相模守); Sakon'e-no-shōshō (左近衛少将)	Junior 4th Rank, Upper Grade (従四位上)	325,000 koku
9	Ikeda Yoshiyuki (池田慶行)	1841 - 1848	Sagami-no-kami (相模守); Sakon'e-no-shōshō (左近衛少将)	Junior 4th Rank, Upper Grade (従四位上)	325,000 koku
10	Ikeda Yoshitaka (池田慶栄)	1848 - 1850	Sagami-no-kami (相模守); Jijū (侍従)	Junior 4th Rank, Upper Grade (従四位上)	325,000 koku
11	Ikeda Yoshinori (池田慶徳)	1850 - 1871	Sagami-no-kami (相模守); Sakon'e-no-chūshō (左近衛中将)	Junior 4th Rank, Upper Grade (従四位上)	325,000 koku

=== Simplified family tree (Ikeda daimyō of Tottori) ===
- Ikeda Tsuneoki (1536–1584)
  - Terumasa, 1st Lord of Himeji (1565–1613)
    - Toshitaka, 2nd Lord of Himeji (1584–1616)
      - I. Mitsumasa, 3rd Lord of Himeji, 1st Lord of Tottori (2nd creation) (1609–1682; Lord of Himeji: 1614–1617; Lord of Tottori: 1617–1632)
        - Tsunamasa, 2nd Lord of Okayama (3rd creation) (1638–1714)
          - Masazumi, 6th Lord of Amaki (1706–1766)
            - Shizuko, m. Ichijō Michika (1722–1769)
              - Ichijō Mitsuruko (1752–1786), m. Tokugawa Harumori, 6th Lord of Mito (1751–1805)
                - Tokugawa Harutoshi, 7th Lord of Mito (1773–1816)
                  - Tokugawa Nariaki, 9th Lord of Mito (1800–1860)
                    - XII. Ikeda (Tokugawa) Yoshikatsu, 12th Lord of Tottori, 12th family head (1837–1877; r. 1850–1869; Governor: 1869–1871; family head: 1869–1877), m. Ikeda Hiroko (1842–1872; see below)
                      - Terutomo, 13th family head, 1st Marquess (1852–1890; family head: 1877–1890; 1st Marquess: 1884)
                        - Kyōko (1884–1923). m. Ikeda (Tokugawa) Nakahiro, 14th family head, 2nd Marquess (1877–1948; family head: 1890–1948; 2nd Marquess: 1890–1946)
                          - Narizane, 15th family head (1904–1993; family head: 1948–1993). He adopted a son:
                            - Toshio, 16th family head (b. 1934)
      - Tadakatsu, 2nd Lord of Okayama (2nd creation) (1602–1632)
        - I. Mitsunaka, 1st Lord of Tottori (3rd creation) (1630–1693; r. 1632–1685)
          - II. Tsunakiyo, 2nd Lord of Tottori (3rd creation) (1648–1711; r. 1685–1700)
          - Nakasumi, Lord of Tottori-Shinden (1650–1722)
            - III. Yoshiyasu, 3rd Lord of Tottori (3rd creation) (1687–1739; r. 1700–1739)
              - IV. Muneyasu, 4th Lord of Tottori (3rd creation) (1717–1747; r. 1739–1747)
                - V. Shigenobu, 5th Lord of Tottori (3rd creation) (1746–1783; r. 1747–1783)
                  - VI. Harumichi, 6th Lord of Tottori (3rd creation) (1768–1798; r. 1783–1798)
                    - VII. Narikuni, 7th Lord of Tottori (3rd creation) (1787–1807; r. 1798–1807)
                    - VIII. Naritoshi, 8th Lord of Tottori (3rd creation) (1788–1830; r. 1807–1830)
                      - IX. Narimichi, 9th Lord of Tottori (3rd creation) (1830–1841; r. 1830–1841)
                  - Nakamasa, 7th Lord of Tottori-Shinden (1780–1841)
                    - Nakanori, 8th Lord of Tottori-Shinden (1805–1850)
                      - X. Yoshiyuki, 10th Lord of Tottori (3rd creation) (1832–1848; r. 1841–1848)
                      - Seiko (1834–1879) m. XI. Ikeda (Maeda) Yoshitaka, 11th Lord of Tottori (3rd creation) (1834–1850; r. 1848–1850)
    - Teruzumi, Lord of Shikano (1604–1662)
      - Masatake, 2nd Lord of Fukumoto (1649–1687)
        - Masachika (1684–1751)
          - Masakatsu (1709–1782)
            - Sadatsune, 5th Lord of Wakasa (1767–1833)
              - Sadayasu, 7th Lord of Wakasa (1805–1847)
                - Hiroko (1842–1872). m. XII. Ikeda (Tokugawa) Yoshikatsu, 12th Lord of Tottori (see above)
  - I. Nagayoshi, 1st Lord of Tottori (1st creation) (1570–1614; r. 1600–1614)
    - II. Nagayuki, 2nd Lord of Tottori (1st creation) (1587–1632; r. 1614–1617)

== Shikano Domain ==
In 1685, Ikeda Mitsunaka gave 25,000 koku of new rice lands to his second son, Ikeda Nakazumi, and established a cadet branch of the clan. On August 7, 1702, during the last years of Ikeda Nakazumi's reign, an additional 5,000 koku was added to bring the kokudaka of the domain to 30,000 koku. It existed as a "paper domain" throughout most of the Edo period with its revenues coming from the treasury of the parent domain, but on December 10, 1868, a jin'ya was established in what is now the Shikano neighborhood of the city of Tottori. Domain administration was practically non-existent, with officials dispatched from Tottori Domain in charge of domain affairs. The domain existed primarily as "insurance" to prevent attainder of the parent domain should the ruling daimyō die without a successor. In fact, Ikeda Yoshiyasu, the third daimyō of Tottori, and Ikeda Yoshiyuki, the tenth daimyō of Tottori, were adopted from Shikano Domain.

On June 27, 1864, the ninth daimyō of the domain, Ikeda Nakatatsu, committed seppuku after a confrontation with Ikeda Yoshinori, the daimyō of Tottori, over the dispatch of troops to Kyoto. In 1869, the domain was abolished and absorbed back into Tottori Domain. In 1884, a descendant of the last daimyō of Shikano became a viscount in the kazoku peerage.

#	Name	Tenure	Courtesy title	Court Rank	kokudaka
Ikeda clan, 1600-1617 (Tozama)
1	Ikeda Nagasumi (池田仲澄)	1685 - 1703	Iki-no-kami (壱岐守)	Junior 5th Rank, Lower Grade (従五位下)	25,000 ->30,000 koku
2	Ikeda Nagateru (池田仲央)	1703 - 1753	Buzen-no-kami (豊前守)	Junior 5th Rank, Lower Grade (従五位下)	30,000 koku
3	Ikeda Nakatsune (池田仲庸)	1753 - 1758	Settsu-no-kami (摂津守)	Junior 5th Rank, Lower Grade (従五位下)	30,000 koku
4	Ikeda Suminobu (池田澄延)	1758 - 1769	Hida-no-kami (飛騨守)	Junior 5th Rank, Lower Grade (従五位下)	30,000 koku
5	Ikeda Nobutoshi (池田延俊)	1769 - 1771	Shuri-no-Suke (修理亮)	Junior 5th Rank, Lower Grade (従五位下)	30,000 koku
6	Ikeda Sumitoki (池田澄時)	1771 - 1785		Junior 5th Rank, Lower Grade (従五位下)	30,000 koku
7	Ikeda Nakamasa (池田仲雅)	1785 - 1824	Settsu-no-kami (摂津守)	Junior 5th Rank, Lower Grade (従五位下)	30,000 koku
8	Ikeda Nakanori (池田仲律)	1824 - 1850	Iki-no-kami (壱岐守))	Junior 5th Rank, Lower Grade (従五位下)	30,000 koku
9	Ikeda Nakatatsu (池田仲建)	1850 - 1864	Sakon’e-no-shōgen (左近将監))	Junior 5th Rank, Lower Grade (従五位下)	30,000 koku
10	Ikeda Norizumi (池田徳澄)	1864 - 1869	’Settsu-no-kami (摂津守)	Junior 5th Rank, Lower Grade (従五位下)	30,000 koku

== Wakasa Domain ==
In 1700, Ikeda Tsunakiyo, the second daimyō of Tottori gave 15,000 koku of new rice lands to his younger brother Ikeda Kiyosada, and established a cadet branch of the clan. In 1720, an additional 5,000 koku was added to bring the kokudaka of the domain to 20,000 koku. As with Shikano Domain, Wakasa existed as a "paper domain" throughout most of the Edo period with its revenues coming from the treasury of the parent domain, but on December 10, 1868, a jin'ya was established in what is now the Wakasa neighborhood of the city of Tottori. Domain administration was practically non-existent, and officials dispatched from Tottori Domain were in charge of all local domain affairs. The fifth daimyō, Ikeda Sadatsune was a noted literary scholar. In 1884, a descendant of the last daimyō of Wakasa became a viscount in the kazoku peerage.

#	Name	Tenure	Courtesy title	Court Rank	kokudaka
Ikeda clan, 1600-1617 (Tozama)
1	Ikeda Kiyosada (池田清定)	1700 - 1718	Kawachi-no-kami (河内守)	Junior 5th Rank, Lower Grade (従五位下)	15,000 koku
2	Ikeda Sadamasa (池田定賢)	1718 - 1736	Omi-no-kami (近江守)	Junior 5th Rank, Lower Grade (従五位下)	15,000 -> 20,000 koku
3	Ikeda Nakatsune (池田定就)	1736 - 1768	Hyōgo-no-kami (兵庫頭)	Junior 5th Rank, Lower Grade (従五位下)	20,000 koku
4	Ikeda Tadanori (池田定得)	1768 - 1773	Osumi-no-kami (大隈守)	Junior 5th Rank, Lower Grade (従五位下)	20,000 koku
5	Ikeda Tadatsune (池田定常)	1773 - 1802	Nuido-no-kami (縫殿頭)	Junior 5th Rank, Lower Grade (従五位下)	20,000 koku
6	Ikeda Sadaoki (池田定興)	1802 - 1807		Junior 5th Rank, Lower Grade (従五位下)	20,000 koku
7	Ikeda Sadayasu (池田定保)	1808 - 1847	Nagato-no-kami (長門守)	Junior 5th Rank, Lower Grade (従五位下)	20,000 koku
8	Ikeda Kiyonao (池田清直)	1847 - 1858	Awaji-no-kami (淡路守))	Junior 5th Rank, Lower Grade (従五位下)	20,000 koku
9	Ikeda Kiyotsugu (池田清緝)	1858 - 1862	Saemon-no-suke (左衛門佐))	Junior 5th Rank, Lower Grade (従五位下)	20,000 koku
10	Ikeda Norisada (池田徳定)	1862 - 1870	Sagami-no-kami (相模守)	Junior 5th Rank, Lower Grade (従五位下)	20,000 koku

== See also ==
- List of Han
- Abolition of the han system
