= Ikeda Tsugumasa =

Japanese daimyō (1702–1776)

- 池田継政
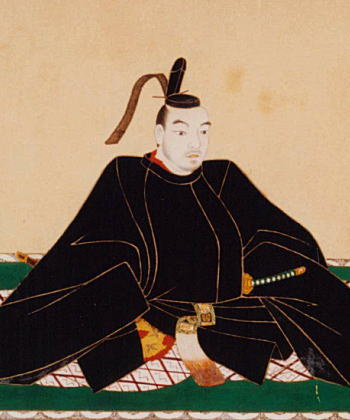
- Portrait from the Hayashibara Museum of Art

Daimyō
- Preceded by: Ikeda Tsunamasa
- Succeeded by: Ikeda Munemasa

Personal details
- Born: 1702
- Died: 1776 (aged 73–74)

Ikeda Tsugumasa (1702–1776) (池田継政) was a daimyō of Okayama during the Edo period of Japan, and head of the Ikeda clan. He was the father of Ikeda Munemasa, who would become daimyō following his father's retirement in 1752. His father was Ikeda Tsunamasa, and Tsugumasa made additions to the Kōraku-en gardens that his father built in Okayama. His childhood name was Shigetaro (茂太郎) later Minechiyo (峯千代).

He was in contact with the Rinzai monk Hakuin Ekaku, whom he first heard lecture on the Diamond Sūtra in Okayama in 1751. Hakuin wrote the kana hōgo Yabukôji for the Lord, and Hebi ichigo (辺鄙以知吾).

== Family ==
- Father: Ikeda Tsunamasa
- Mother: Eiko-in
- Wife: Kazuhime
- Concubine: Yoshiki’in
- Children:
  - Ikeda Munemasa by Kazuhime
  - Ikeda Masataka (1739-1809) by Yoshiki’in
