= Ikeda Tsunamasa =

Japanese daimyō

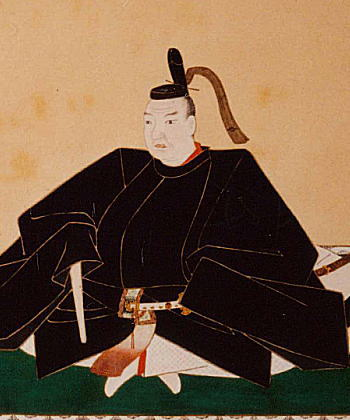

Lord of Okayama
- In office 1672–1714
- Preceded by: Ikeda Mitsumasa
- Succeeded by: Ikeda Tsugumasa

Personal details
- Born: February 18, 1638
- Died: December 5, 1714 (aged 76)

Ikeda Tsunamasa (池田 綱政; February 18, 1638 – December 5, 1714) was a Japanese daimyō of the Edo period. He was the head of the Okayama Domain. His childhood name was Taro (太郎). His mother was the granddaughter of second Shōgun Tokugawa Hidetada.

His adopted daughter married the court noble Ichijō Kaneka.

== Family ==
- Father: Ikeda Mitsumasa
- Mother: Katsuhime (1618-1678)
- Wife: Niwa Senko
- Concubines:
  - Kikuno
  - Eiko-in
- Children
  - Ikeda Yoshimasa (1678-1695)
  - Ikeda Noritaka (1680-1720) by Kikuno
  - Ikeda Masayuki (1696-1709)
  - Ikeda Tsugumasa by Eiko-in
  - Ikeda Masazumi (1706-1766) by Eiko-in
  - Ikeda Tsuneyuki (1672-1679)
  - Matsuhime married Hotta Masanaka
  - Furihime married Honda Tadakuni
  - Kikuhime Yamauchi Toyohusa
  - Masako married Mori Yoshimoto
  - Haruko married Tachibana Akitaka
  - Tsumahime betrothed to Kanamori Yoritoki

== See also ==
- Kōraku-en

Preceded by Ikeda Mitsumasa	2nd (Ikeda) daimyō of Okayama; 1672–1714	Succeeded by Ikeda Tsugumasa
