= Okayama Domain =

Administrative division in western Japan during the Edo period (1600-1871)

Okayama Domain 岡山藩
- Domain of Japan
- 1600–1871
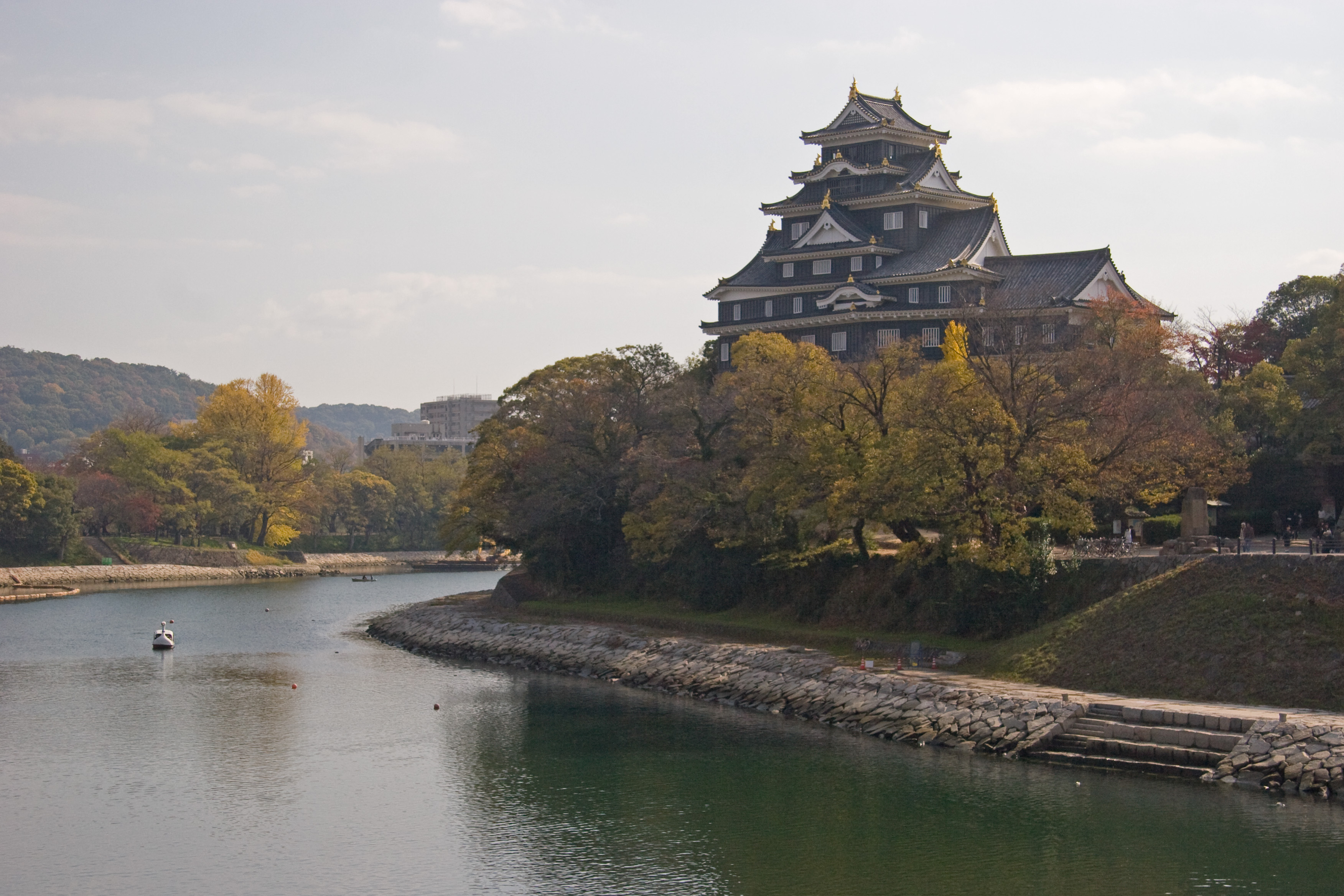
- Okayama Castle

- Mon of the Ikeda clan
- Capital: Okayama Castle
- Area
  - Coordinates: 34°39′54.65″N 133°56′9.79″E
- Historical era: Edo period
  - Established: 1600
  - Abolition of the han system: 1871
- Contained within
  - Province: Bizen and part of Bitchū
- Today part of: Okayama Prefecture

Location of Okayama Castle
Okayama Domain (Japan)

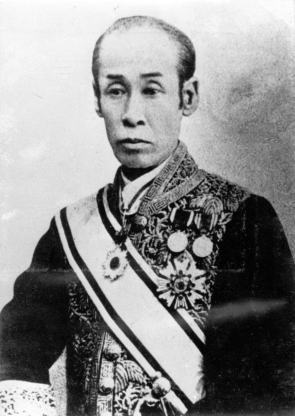
Ikeda Akimasa

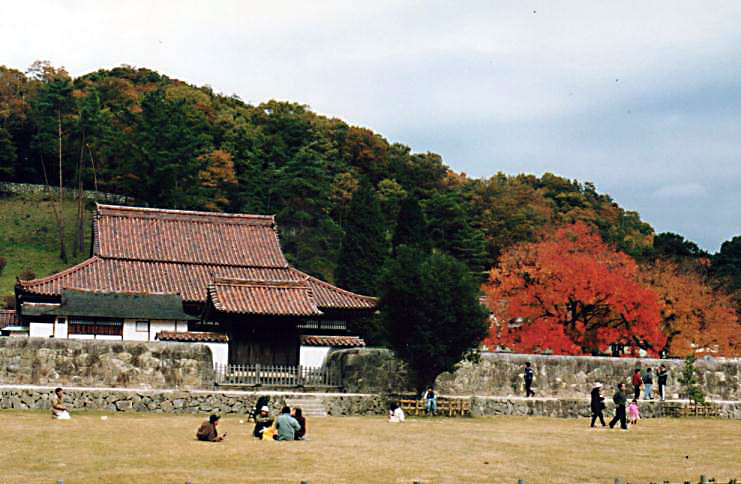
Auditorium of the Shizutani School

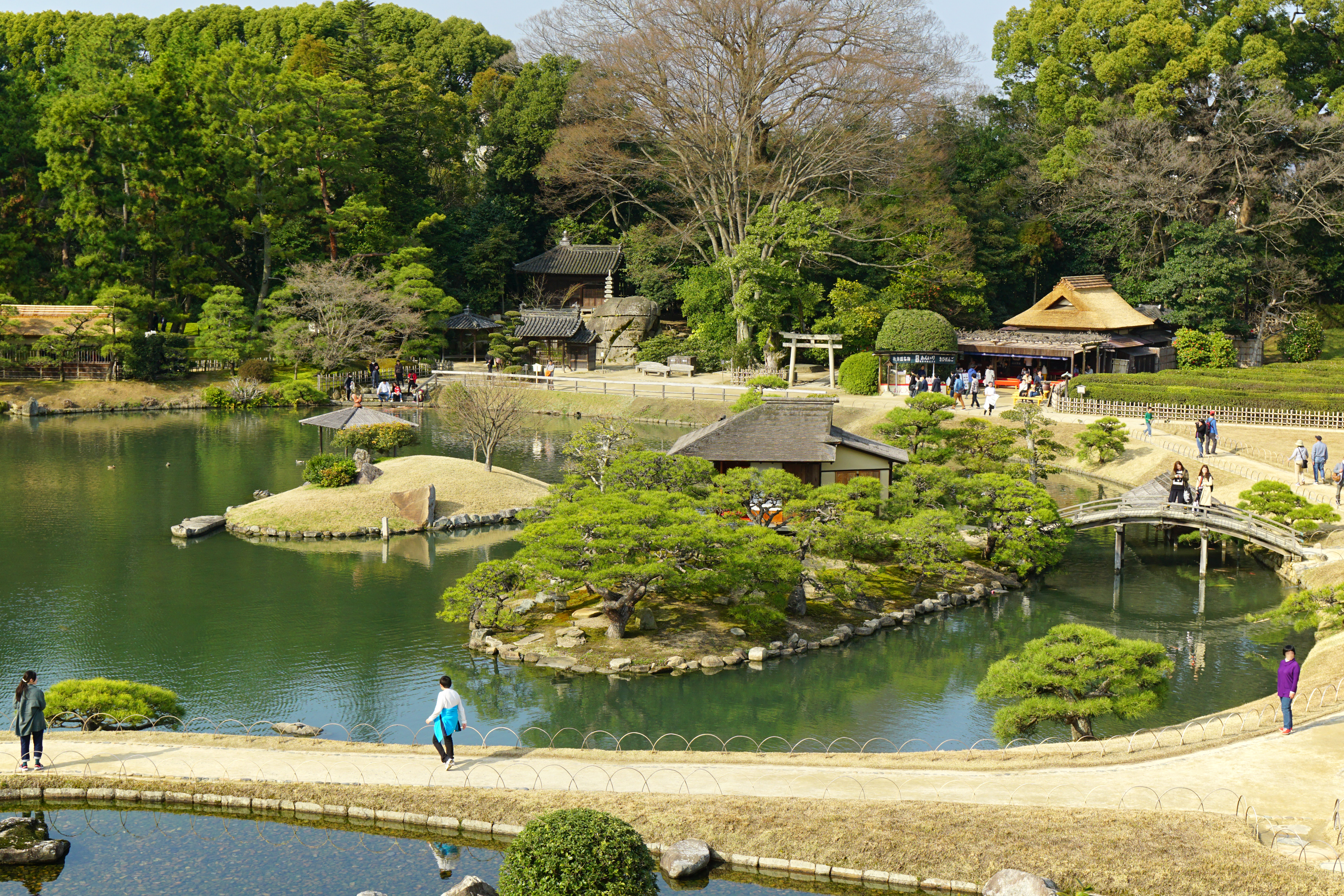
Kōraku-en

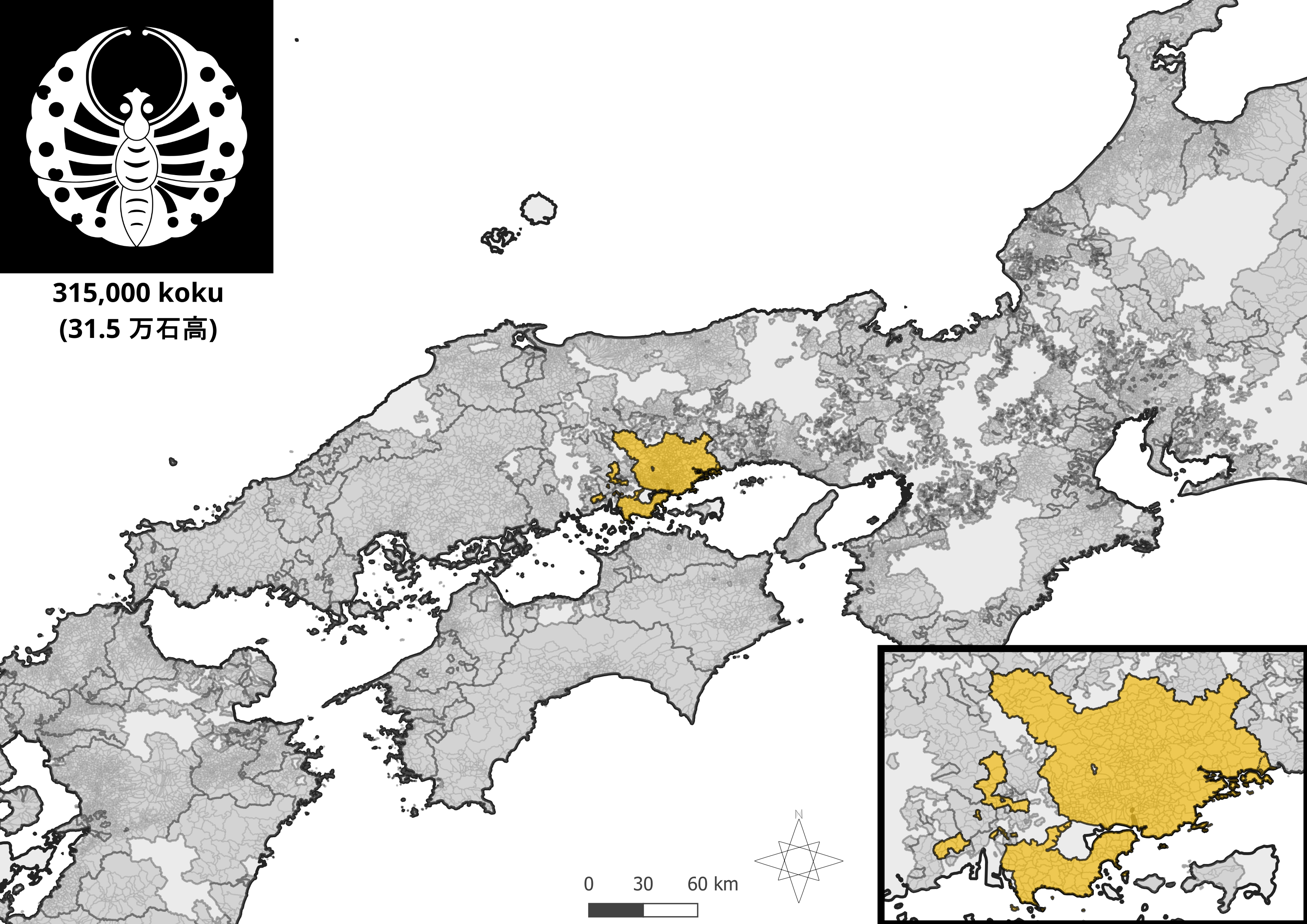
The territory and kokudaku of the Okayama domain at the end of the Edo period.

Okayama Domain (岡山藩, Okayama-han) was a feudal domain under the Tokugawa shogunate of Edo period Japan, in what is now eastern Okayama Prefecture on the island of Honshu. It controlled all of Bizen Province and a small portion of Bitchū Province was centered around Okayama Castle, and was ruled throughout its history by a branch of the Ikeda clan. Okayama Domain was dissolved in the abolition of the han system in 1871 and is now part of Okayama Prefecture. Okayama Domain had two sub-domains, Kamogata Domain (鴨方藩) and Ikusaka Domain (生坂藩). In addition, six of the clans who served as hereditary karō of the domain had kokudaka equivalents to that of daimyō.

== History ==
During the Sengoku period, Okayama was held by Ukita Hideie. However, as he sided with the Western Army at the Battle of Sekigahara in 1600, he was dispossessed by the victorious Tokugawa Ieyasu and his domains given to Kobayakawa Hideaki. Kobayakawa Hideaki died without heir in 1602. In 1603, Ikeda Tadatsugu, the second son of Ikeda Terumasa of Himeji Domain was awarded Okayama with a kokudaka of 280,000 koku. This was increased in 1613 with an additional 100,000 koku. However, he died in 1615 without heir and the domain was transferred to his younger brother, Ikeda Tadao castellan of Yura Castle on Awaji Island, albeit with a reduction from 380,000 to 315.000 koku. After Ikeda Tadao's death in 1632, his heir, Ikeda Mitsunaka was regarded by the Tokugawa shogunate as being too young to be entrusted with the critically-important Okayama Castle, with its strategic location on the San'yōdō highway and reassigned him to Tottori Domain. Okayama went to his cousin, Ikeda Mitsumasa, formerly of Tottori Domain. His descendants would continue to rule Okayama until the Meiji restoration.

In 1644, Ikeda Mitsumasa was authorized to construct the Tamaigū Tōshō-gū, which was the first Tōshōgū authorized to be constructed outside of territories under direct control of the Tokugawa clan. The reason why the Ikeda clan was given such preferential treatment was because Tokuhime, the daughter of Tokugawa Ieyasu, had married Ikeda Terumasa and thus both Tadatsugu and Tadao were Ieyasu's grandsons. Ikeda Mitsumasa along with Tokugawa Mitsukuni and Hoshina Masayuki is regarded as one of the three great daimyō of the early Edo Period. In 1669, he opened the Okayama Domain Han School, the first han school to be constructed in Japan. He also opened the Shizutani School in 1670, the oldest school for commoners. He was also active in land reclamation and flood control civil engineering projects throughout his domain. In 1700, his son Ikeda Tsurumasa completed the Kōraku-en, one of the Three Great Gardens of Japan, along with Kenroku-en and Kairaku-en. In the Bakumatsu period, Ikeda Shigemasa, the 9th daimyō, was the ninth son of Tokugawa Nariaki and thus the younger brother of the last Shogun Tokugawa Yoshinobu. He was a strong proponent of the Kōbu gattai policy of uniting the shogunate with the Imperial family; however, he was forced into retirement at the start of the Boshin War. In the immediate aftermath of the Meiji restoration, the domain was involved in the Kobe Incident of 1868, a major crisis in Franco–Japanese relations, and the first major international affairs challenge for the fledgling Meiji government. In 1871, with the abolition of the han system, the domain became part of Okayama Prefecture. then Ikeda clan was ennobled with the kazoku peerage title of marquis in 1884.

== Holdings at the end of the Edo period ==
As with most domains in the han system, Tottori Domain consisted of several discontinuous territories calculated to provide the assigned kokudaka, based on periodic cadastral surveys and projected agricultural yields, g.

- Bizen Province (entire province)
  - 108 villages in Shōtō District
  - 94 villages in Akasaka District
  - 62 villages in Mino District
  - 91 villages in Kojima District
  - 79 villages in Oku District
  - 89 villages in Wake District
  - 64 villages in Iwanashi District
  - 93 villages in Tsudaka District
- Bitchū Province
  - 18 villages in Kuboya District
  - 11 villages in Asakuchi District
  - 3 villages in Kaya District
  - 9 villages in Katō District

== List of daimyō ==
#	Name	Tenure	Courtesy title	Court Rank	kokudaka
Kobayakawa clan, 1600-1602 (Tozama)
1	Kobayakawa Hideaki (小早川秀秋)	1600 - 1602	Gon-chūnagon (権中納言)	Third Rank (従三位)	510,000 koku
Ikeda clan, 1603-1632 (Tozama, but equivalent to Shinpan)
1	Ikeda Tadatsugu (池田忠継)	1603 - 1615	Saemon-no-kami (左衛門督); Jijū (侍従)	Junior 4th Rank, Lower Grade (従四位下)	280,000 -> 380,000 koku
2	Ikeda Tadakatsu (池田忠雄)	1615 - 1632	Kunai-shōyū (宮内少輔)	Upper 4th Rank, Lower Grade (正四位下)	380,000 -> 315,000 koku
Ikeda clan, 1632-1871 (Tozama)
1	Ikeda Mitsumasa (池田光政)	1632 - 1672	Sakon'e-gon-shōshō (左近衛権少将)	Junior 4th Rank, Lower Grade (従四位下)	315,000 koku
2	Ikeda Tsunemasa (池田綱政)	1672 - 1714	Sakon'e-no-shōshō (左近衛少将)	Junior 4th Rank, Lower Grade (従四位下)	315,000 koku
3	Ikeda Tsugumasa (池田継政)	1714 - 1752	Sakon'e-gon-shōshō (左近衛権少将)	Junior 4th Rank, Lower Grade (従四位下)	315,000 koku
4	Ikeda Munemasa (池田宗政)	1752 - 1764	Iyo-no-kami (伊予守); Jijū (侍従)	Junior 4th Rank, Lower Grade (従四位下)	315,000 koku
5	Ikeda Harumasa (池田治政)	1764 - 1794	Sakon'e-gon-shōshō (左近衛権少将)	Junior 4th Rank, Lower Grade (従四位下)	315,000 koku
6	Ikeda Narimasa (池田斉政)	1794 - 1829	Sakon'e-gon-shōshō (左近衛権少将)	Junior 4th Rank, Lower Grade (従四位下)	315,000 koku
7	Ikeda Naritoshi (池田斉敏)	1829 - 1842	Sakon'e-gon-shōshō (左近衛権少将)	Junior 4th Rank, Lower Grade (従四位下)	315,000 koku
8	Ikeda Yoshimasa (池田慶政)	1842 - 1863	Sakon'e-gon-shōshō (左近衛権少将)	Junior 4th Rank, Lower Grade (従四位下)	315,000 koku
9	Ikeda Mochimasa (池田茂政)	1863 - 1868	Sakon'e-gon-shōshō (左近衛権少将), Jijū (侍従)	Junior 4th Rank, Upper Grade (従四位上)	315,000 koku
10	Ikeda Akimasa (池田章政)	1868 - 1871	Sakon'e-gon-shōshō (左近衛権少将), Jijū (侍従)	Junior 4th Rank, Upper Grade (従四位上)	315,000 koku

== Kamogata Domain ==
In 1672, Ikeda Mitsumasa gave 25,000 koku of new rice lands in Asakuchi and Kuboya Districts, Bitchū Province, to his second son, Ikeda Masamoto, and established a cadet branch of the clan. A jin'ya was established in what is now then Kamagata neighborhood of the city of Asakuchi, Okayama; however, its nominal daimyō lived within the jōkamachi of Okayama. The domain existed primarily as "insurance" to prevent attainder of the parent domain should the ruling daimyō die without a successor. Throughout its history, it was known as Okayama Shinden Domain (岡山新田藩), becoming "Kamogata Domain" only after the Meiji restoration.

== Ikusaka Domain ==
In 1672, Ikeda Mitsumasa gave 15,000 koku of new rice lands in Kuboya District, Bitchū Province, to his third son, Ikeda Terutoshi, and established a cadet branch of the clan. It existed as a "paper domain" throughout most of the Edo period with its revenues coming from the treasury of the parent domain, and its nominal daimyō lived within the jōkamachi of Okayama. Domain administration was non-existent, with officials dispatched from Okayama Domain in charge of domain affairs. The domain existed primarily as "insurance" to prevent attainder of the parent domain should the ruling daimyō die without a successor. Throughout its history, it was known as Okayama Shinden Domain (岡山新田藩), becoming "Ikusaka Domain" only after the Meiji restoration.

== Genealogy (simplified; Ikeda clan – Okayama) ==
- Ikeda Tsuneoki (1536–1584)
  - Terumasa, 1st daimyō of Himeji (1565–1613)
    - Toshitaka, 2nd daimyō of Himeji (1584–1616)
      - I. Mitsumasa, 1st daimyō of Okayama (2nd creation. cr. 1632) (1609–1682; r. 1632–1672)
        - II. Tsunamasa, 2nd daimyō of Okayama (2nd creation) (1638–1714; r. 1672–1714)
          - III. Tsugumasa, 3rd daimyō of Okayama (2nd creation) (1702–1776; r. 1714–1752)
            - IV. Munemasa, 4th daimyō of Okayama (2nd creation) (1727–1764; r. 1752–1764)
              - V. Harumasa, 5th daimyō of Okayama (2nd creation) (1750–1819; r. 1764–1794)
                - VI. Narimasa, 6th daimyō of Okayama (2nd creation) (1773–1833; r. 1794–1829)
              - Sagara Nagahiro, 12th daimyō of Hitoyoshi (1752–1813)
                - Sagara Yorinori, 13th daimyō of Hitoyoshi (1774–1856)
                  - Sagara Yoriyuki, 14th daimyō of Hitoyoshi (1798–1850)
                    - X. Akimasa, 10th daimyō of Okayama (2nd creation) 1st Marquess (1836–1903; r. 1868–1869, Governor of Okayama: 1869–1871, Marquess: 1884)
                      - Norimasa, 13th family head and 2nd Marquess (1865–1909; 11th family head and 2nd Marquess: 1903–1909)
                        - Tadamasa, 14th family head and 3rd Marquess (1895–1920; 12th family head and 3rd Marquess: 1909–1920).
                        - Nobumasa, 15th family head and 4th Marquess (1904–1988; 13th family head and 4th Marquess: 1920–1947, 13th family head: 1947–1988)
                          - Takamasa, 16th family head (1926–2012; 14th family head: 1988–2012). m. Princess Atsuko of the Imperial House of Japan (b. 1931). No issue; the family became extinct after his death.
    - I. Tadatsugu, 1st daimyō of Okayama (1st creation. cr. 1603) (1599–1615; r. 1603–1615)
    - II. Tadakatsu, 2nd daimyō of Okayama (1st creation) (1602–1632; r. 1615–1632)
      - III. Mitsunaka, 3rd daimyō of Okayama (1st creation), 1st daimyō of Tottori (3rd creation) (1630–1693; r. 1632)
        - Nakazumi, 1st daimyō of Tottori-Shinden (1650–1722)
          - Yoshiyasu, 3rd daimyō of Tottori (3rd creation) (1687–1739)
            - Muneyasu, 4th daimyō of Tottori (3rd creation) (1717–1747)
              - Shigenobu, 5th daimyō of Tottori (3rd creation) (1746–1783)
                - Harumichi, 6th daimyō of Tottori (3rd creation) (1768–1798)
                  - Iyohime Chikako (1792–1824) m. Shimazu Narioki, 10th daimyō of Satsuma (1791–1859)
                    - VII. Naritoshi, 7th daimyō of Okayama (2nd creation) (1811–1842; r. 1829–1842)
  - Motosuke (1559–1584)
    - Yoshiyuki (1577–1618)
      - Yoshinari (1605–1676)
        - Yoshitaka (1641–1696)
          - Yoshimichi (1681–1743)
            - Masamichi, 3rd daimyō of Kamogata (1714–1792)
              - Masanao, 5th daimyō of Kamogata (1746–1818)
                - Masami, 6th daimyō of Kamogata (1772–1819)
                  - Masayoshi, 8th daimyō of Kamogata (1811–1847)
                    - Utako (1830–1877) m. VIII. Yoshimasa, 8th daimyō of Okayama (2nd creation) (1823–1893; r. 1842–1863. Son of the 5th daimyō of Nakatsu.)
                      - Hisako (1848-1868) m. IX. Mochimasa, 9th daimyō of Okayama (2nd creation) (1839–1899; r. 1863–1868. Son of Tokugawa Nariaki, daimyō of Mito.)

== See also ==
- List of Han
- Abolition of the han system
