= Ikeda Mitsumasa =

Japanese daimyō

- 池田 光政

Daimyō of Himeji
- In office 1616–1617
- Preceded by: Ikeda Toshitaka
- Succeeded by: Honda Tadamasa

Daimyō of Tottori
- In office 1617–1632
- Preceded by: Ikeda Nagayuki
- Succeeded by: Ikeda Mitsunaka

Daimyō of Okayama
- In office 1632–1672
- Preceded by: Ikeda Tadakatsu
- Succeeded by: Ikeda Tsunamasa

Personal details
- Born: May 10, 1609
- Died: June 27, 1682 (aged 73)
- Spouse: Katsuhime

Ikeda Mitsumasa (池田 光政; May 10, 1609 – June 27, 1682) was a Japanese daimyō of the early Edo period.

== Early life ==
His childhood name was Shintarō (新太郎).He was the son of Ikeda Toshitaka with Tsuruhime, daughter of Sakakibara Yasumasa. He adopted daughter of Tokugawa Hidetada. He married Katsuhime, daughter of Honda Tadatoki with Senhime who was the daughter of Tokugawa Hidetada with Oeyo and Tokugawa Ieyasu's favorite granddaughter.

== Family ==
- Father: Ikeda Toshitaka (1584-1616)
- Mother: Tsuruhime (d.1672)
- Wife: Katsuhime (1618-1678)
- Concubines:
  - Mizuno Katsunoshin's daughter
  - Okuni no Kata
- Children:
  - Ikeda Tsunamasa by Katsuhime
  - Jiunin married Honda Tadahira by Katsuhime
  - Seigen’in (1636-1717) married Ichijo Norisuke by Katsuhime
  - Daughter married Sakakibara Masafusa by Katsuhime
  - daughter married Nakagawa Hisatsune by Katsuhime
  - Ikeda Masakoto (1645-1700) by Mizuno Katsunoshin's daughter
  - Ikeda Terutoshi (1649-1714) by Okuni no Kata
  - Rokuhime (1645-1680) married Ikeda Yoshisada latre married Takikawa Kazumune by Okuni no Kata
  - Shichihime (1647-1652) by Okuni no Kata
  - Kiyohime (1653-1686) married Mori Moritsuna by Okuni no Kata
  - daughter (1657-1662) by Okuni no Kata

== Daimyo ==
After his father's death in 1616, Mitsumasa inherited his father's domains in Harima Province.

In 1617, he was transferred to Tottori Domain (325,000 koku) with Inaba Province and Hōki Province as fiefs.

In 1632, he was transferred to Okayama Domain (315,000 koku) at Bizen. His descendants continued to live at Okayama.

He was also a Confucian scholar, and was a patron of Kumazawa Banzan, 17th century Confucian scholar.

Preceded by Ikeda Toshitaka	Daimyō of Himeji; 1616–1617	Succeeded by Honda Tadamasa
Preceded by Ikeda Nagayuki	Daimyō of Tottori; 1617–1632	Succeeded by Ikeda Mitsunaka
Preceded by Ikeda Tadakatsu	Daimyō of Okayama; 1632–1672	Succeeded by Ikeda Tsunamasa
