= Ōya-Sada Kofun Cluster =

Kofun period burial mound cluster in Maniwa, Okayama, Japan

- 大谷・定古墳群 (Japanese)
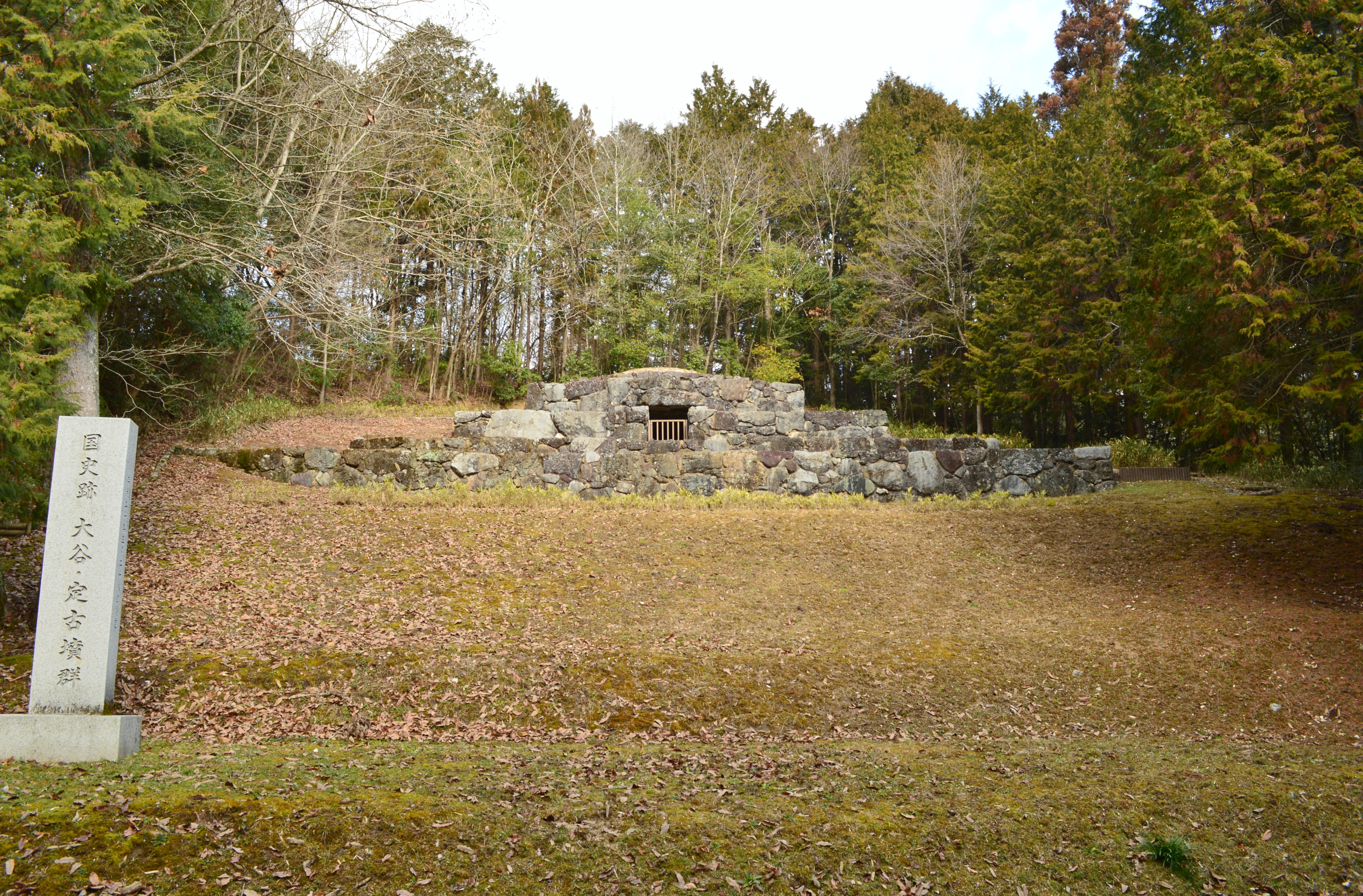
- Ōya No.1Kofun

- Ōya-Sada Kofun Cluster Ōya-Sada Kofun Cluster (Japan)
- 34°56′22″N 133°37′29″E
- Type: Kofun
- Periods: Kofun period
- Location: Maniwa, Okayama, Japan
- Region: San'yō region

History
- Built: 6th-7th century AD

Site notes
- Public access: Yes

大谷・定古墳群分布図

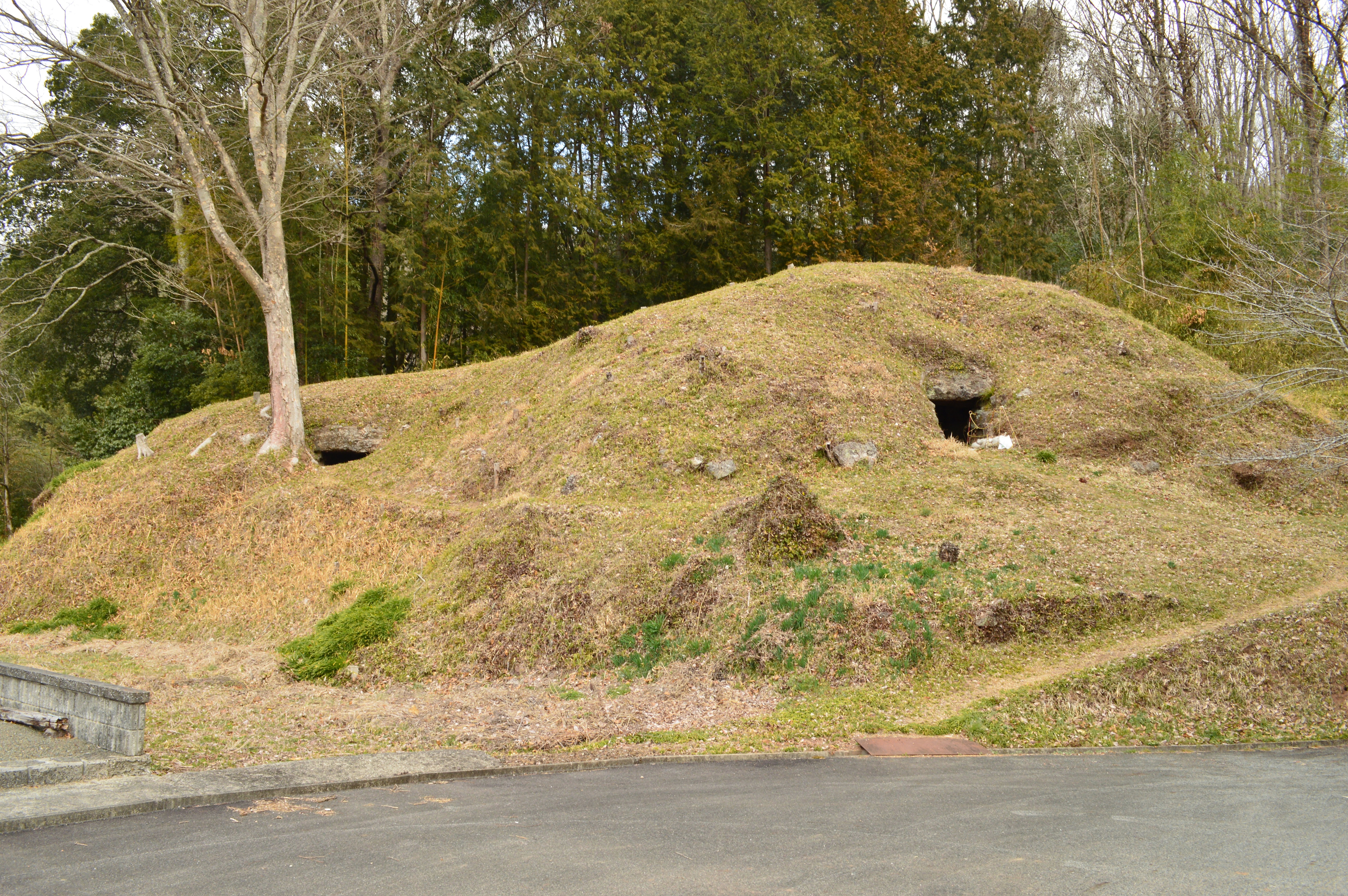
Sada-Higashi and Sada-Nishi Kofun

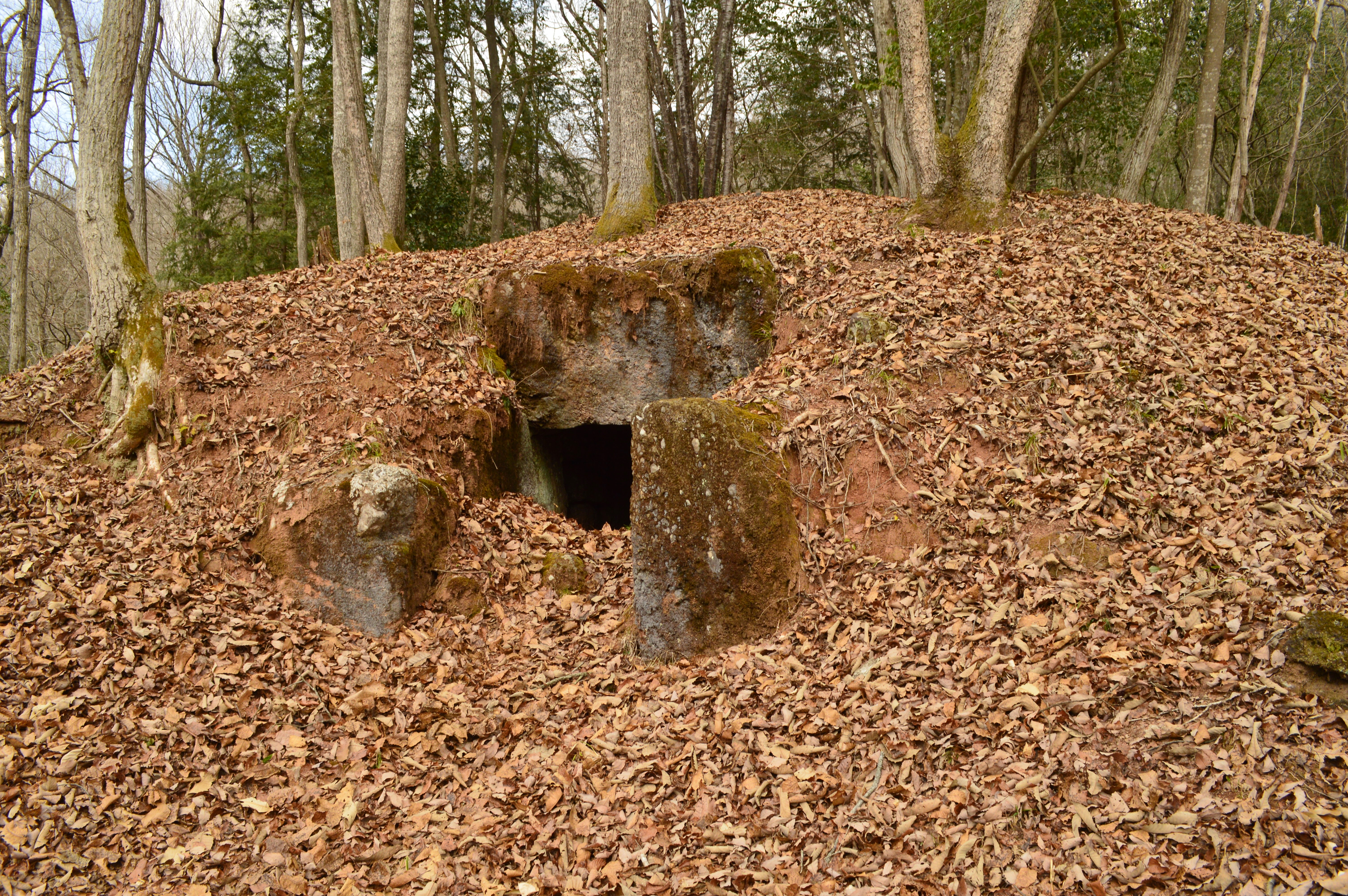
Sada-Kita Kofun

The Ōya-Sada Kofun Cluster (大谷・定古墳群, Ōya-Sada Kofun-gun) is a group of six kofun burial mounds located in the Kaminakatsui neighborhood of the city of Maniwa, Okayama Prefecture, in the San'yō region of Japan. The tumuli were collectively designated a National Historic Site in 2008. The tumuli area considered to be representative of large chieftain tombs of the late Kofun period of the Kingdom of Kibi.

== Background ==
The Ōya-Sada Kofun Cluster is located by the Nakatsui River, which flows through a basin surrounded by the Kibi Plateau, in southern Maniwa. A common feature is that all are hōfun (方墳)-style rectangular burial mounds, with a stepped (pyramid) structure and a stone wall layer of outer stones.

Ōya No.1 burial mound was built in the latter half of the 7th century. Archaeological excavations have unearthed gold-decorated iron swords and other items from the cut stone burial chamber. It is believed to date from the late 7th century. The Sada Kofun cluster is located at the foot of the mountain 1.5 km east of the Ōya No. 1 Kofun, and consist of five tumuli. The Sada-Higashi and Sada-Nishi tumuli were once regarded as a single "two conjoined rectangles" type (zenpō-kōhō-fun (前方後方墳)); however, subsequent research indicated that they are separate tumuli.

Sada-Higashi Kofun

The Sada-Higashi Kofun is rectangular, measuring 25 meters north to south, 18 meters east to west, and 6 meters high. The mound is surrounded by two tiers of stones. Excavations were conducted from 1994 to 1997. The burial facility is a horizontal stone chamber orientated to the south. The total length of the burial chamber is 11.6 meters including the entry passage. Inside were four Haji-style ceramic coffins (2 tortoise shell-shaped, 2 gabled house-shaped, 1 four-pillar house-shaped) and a nailed wooden coffin. Grave goods included cearrings, small beads, gold thread iron long swords, arrowheads, halberds, and metal fittings, horse harness and metal fittings, agricultural tools and Sue ware pottery (bowls, lids, vases, jars). It is estimated to have been built around the end of the Kofun period, around the first half of the 7th century, and is the oldest among the cluster of kofun.

Sada-Nishi Kofu

The Sada-Nishi Kofun was built adjacent to the west side of the Sada-Higashi Kofun on the southern foot of a hill overhanging the east bank of the Nakatsui River. The mound is rectangular, measuring 16 meters north to south, 14 meters east to west, and 4.5 meters high and is surrounded by two tiers of stones. Excavations were conducted in 1994–1997. The burial facility is a horizontal stone chamber orientated to the south. The total length of the burial chamber including the entry passage was 10.7 meters. Inside were six Haji pottery coffins (2 tortoiseshell-shaped, 4 gabled house-shaped) and nailed wooden coffins. Grave goods were similar to that of the Sada-Higashi Kofun, and date the construction to the end of the Kofun period, around the first half of the 7th century, and immediately following the Sada-Higashi Kofun.

Sada-Kita Kofun

The Sada-Kita Kofun is located about 70 meters north of the Sada-Higashi Kofun and Sada-Nishi Kofun on the southern slope of a hill overhanging the east bank of the Nakatsui River. The mound is rectangular, measuring 25.3 meters from north to south and 21 meters from east to west, and is surrounded by three tiers of outer guard stones; the middle tier measuring 1.8 meters contains the opening of the burial chamber. Excavations were conducted from 1990 to 1993. The burial facility is a horizontal stone chamber orientated to the south. The chamber is two-tiered and is paved with flat pebbles. Inside were four Haji pottery coffins (2 tortoiseshell-shaped, 2 gabled house-shaped), wooden coffins with nails (1.8m in length, 0.6m in width), and an additional burial urn (medicine pot-shaped Sue ware). Grave goods included small ball and cut-glass beads, weapons (iron swords, arrowheads), copper bowls, ax-shaped iron products, and Sue ware (bowls, lids, and flat jars). Sue pottery jars have also been unearthed on both sides of the opening. The tumulus is estimated to have been built around the middle of the 7th century, at the end of the Kofun period.

Ōya No.1 Kofun

The Ōya No.1 Kofun was built on the southern slope of a hill overhanging the west bank of the Nakatsui River. The mound is rectangular, measuring 13.1 meters east–west, 9.8 meters north–south, and 3.8 meters high. It is surrounded by three tiers of stone guards, and two tiers of stones (18–22 meters in length) in front of the mound, giving the front view the appearance of a five-tier construction.The top of the mound is covered with flat stones. Excavations were conducted in 1988 and from 1992 to 1994. The burial facility is a horizontal stone chamber with two sleeves and opens in the south-southeast direction. The burial chamber was made from five megalithic stones, one each on the back wall, east wall, and ceiling, and two on the west wall. Inside was a Sue ware ceramic coffin shaped like a house and a wooden coffin. Although the burial chamber had been robbed in antiquity, a number of grave goods were found, including a pair of dragon hilt swords, arrowheads, and arrowhead-shaped gilt bronze products and both Sue ware and Haji ware pottery. The excavated hilt swords are an important cultural property designated by Okayama Prefecture. The tumulus is estimated to have been built around the end of the Kofun period around the latter half of the 7th century. Although it is not clear who was buried, there is a theory that he was Prince Ishikawa no Okimi, who died in 672, who played a role in the Jinshin War and was recognized as ruler of Kibi around this time.

Sada No.4 Kofun

The Sada No.4 Kofun was excavated in 2006. Measuring approximately 6.6 meters from north to south and 8.2 meters from east to west, it is a three-tiered square tumulus. No relics have been found in the stone chamber, but plate-shaped iron products have been excavated from the southern end of the research area. It is estimated to have been built between the end of the 7th century and the beginning of the 8th century, the end of the Kofun period, making it the newest and smallest burial mound in the cluster.

Sada No.5 Kofun

The Sada No.5 Kofun was also excavated in 2006. It is a two-tiered square burial mound measuring about 8 meters from north to south and about 10.4 meters from east to west. Sue ware was found in the burial chamber. It is estimated to have been built in the latter half of the 7th century, at the end of the Kofun period.

Large chieftain tombs of the 6th century Kingdom of Kibi were built in the southern part of the Kibi region, but the northern region, which is an important transportation hub and rich in iron resources, came under Yamato political influence in the 7th century and the construction of large burial mounds in this region shows a shifting of political and economic power from the south to the north during this time. In addition, the Kodono Site, believed to be the ruins of a Nara period kanga (district headquarters) are located nearby, and it ay have some connection to this tumuli cluster.

The site is about ten minutes by car from Chugoku Expressway Hokubo IC.

Ōya-Sada Kofun Cluster main tumuli
Area	Name	Type	Dimensions	Burial chamber	Sarcophagus	Date
Sada	Sada-Higashi	hōfun	18 x 25m	Single horizontal stone chamber	Haji pottery coffin (4), wooden coffin	early 7th c
Sada	Sada-Nishi	hōfun	14-16m	Single horizontal stone chamber	Haji pottery coffin (6), wooden coffin	early 7th c
Sada	Sada-Kita	hōfun	21-25.3m	Double horizontal stone chamber	Haji clay pottery coffin (4), wooden coffin	mid 7th c
Oya	Ōya No.1	hōfun	9.8-13.1m (22m)	Double horizontal stone chamber	Sue clay pottery coffin (1), wooden coffin	Late 7th c

== See also ==
- List of Historic Sites of Japan (Okayama)
