= Yotsuzuka Kofun Cluster =

Kofun period burial mound cluster in Maniwa, Okayama, Japan

Yotsuzuka Kofun cluster
- 四ツ塚古墳群 (Japanese)
- Yotsuzuka Kofun cluster Yotsuzuka Kofun Cluster (Japan)
- Interactive map of Yotsuzuka Kofun cluster
- 35°17′49″N 133°43′01″E
- Type: Kofun
- Periods: Kofun period
- Location: Maniwa, Okayama, Japan
- Region: San'yō region

History
- Built: 6th century AD

Site notes
- Public access: Yes

The Yotsuzuka Kofun cluster (四ツ塚古墳群, Yotsuzuka Kofun-gun) is a group of kofun burial mounds located in the Hiruzen Kaminaga neighborhood of the city of Maniwa, Okayama Prefecture, in the San'yō region of Japan. The tumuli were collectively designated a National Historic Site in 1929.

== Background ==
The Yotsuzuka Kofun cluster consists of 16 large and small burial mounds built on a terrace on the left bank of the Asahi River in the Hiruzen Basin of northern Okayama surrounded by the Chūgoku Mountains. More than 170 kofun have been identified in the Hiruzen Basin in total, among which the four circular-type (empun (円墳) in the Yotsuzuka Kofun cluster are the largest. Per an archaeological excavation, Yotsuzuka No.1 was determined to be 24 meters in diameter, and to have a side-entry type stone burial chamber orientated to the north. More than 100 grave goods were found, including beads, iron products, and Sue ware pottery. These excavated items are now stored in the Tokyo National Museum and date the tumulus to the late Kofun period, or around AD 500. During an excavation of the Yotsuzuka No.13 tumulus (which is not part of the National Historic Site), large numbers of chicken and house-shaped haniwa were recovered. These artifacts are stored and exhibited at the Hiruzen Folk Museum.

The Yotsuzuka Historic Site Park has been developed around the 16 remaining tumuli and is located about 15 minutes by car from Yonago Expressway Hiruzen IC.

== See also ==
- List of Historic Sites of Japan (Okayama)
