= Sōzume Tō =

Asuka period temple ruins in Okayama, Japan

Sōzume Tō Site
- 惣爪塔跡 (Japanese)
- Sōzume Tō Site Sōzume Tō (Japan)
- Interactive map of Sōzume Tō Site
- 34°40′04″N 133°49′35″E
- Type: temple ruin
- Periods: Asuka period
- Location: Kita-ku, Okayama, Japan
- Region: San'yō region

History
- Built: c.7th century

Site notes
- Public access: Yes (park)

The Sōzume Tō Site (惣爪塔跡, Sōzume Tō ato) is an archaeological site with the ruins of an Asuka period Buddhist temple located in the Sōzume neighbourhood of what is now Kita-ku in the city of Okayama, in the San'yō region of Japan. The temple no longer exists, but the temple grounds were designated as a National Historic Site in 1928.

== History ==
Sōzume Tō site consists of what appears to be the central the foundation stone for the central pillar of a Japanese pagoda, which is located on the bank of a rice field on the east bank of the Ashimori River. The stone is oblong, with a long axis of 2 meters, short axis of 1.5 meters, and with a circular hole with a diameter of 70-centimeters. Also known as the Ishi no Kama, (i.e. the "stone cauldron"), roof tiles from the Nara period have been excavated from the surrounding area. It is assumed that pagoda was part of temple complex, but no traces of the foundation stones of buildings other than the pagoda have even been confirmed.

The surrounding area is also the site of settlements from the Yayoi period, and Yayoi pottery and other relics have been found under the paddy fields. The site is about a 20-minute walk from Kibitsu Station on the JR West Kibi Line.

== See also ==
- List of Historic Sites of Japan (Okayama)
