= Musa Ōtsuka Kofun =

- 牟佐大塚古墳 (Japanese)
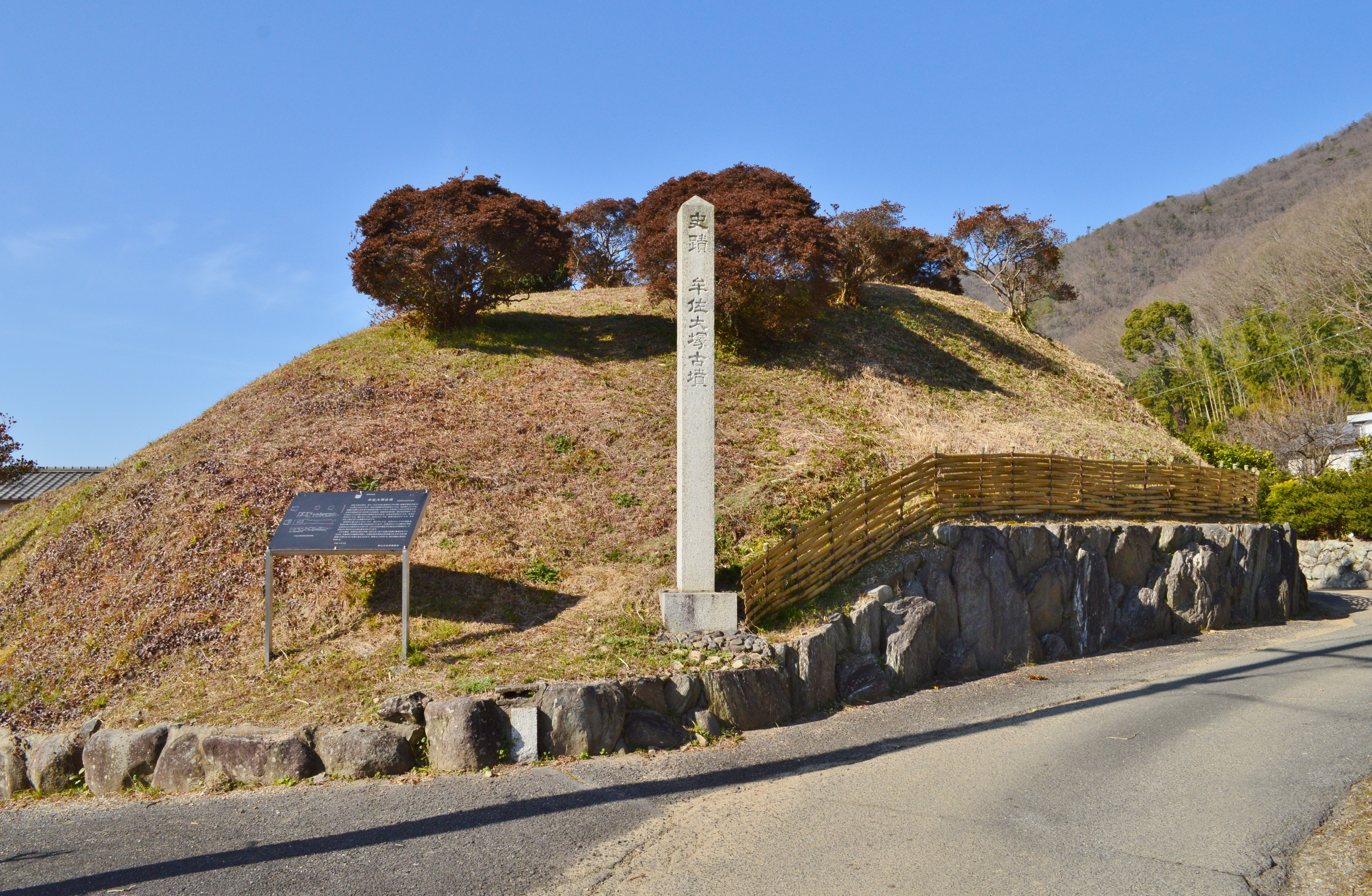
- Musa Ōtsuka Kofun

- Musa Ōtsuka Kofun Musa Ōtsuka Kofun (Japan)
- Interactive map of Musa Ōtsuka Kofun
- 34°43′30.81″N 133°58′36.48″E
- Type: Kofun
- Periods: Kofun period
- Location: Kita-ku, Okayama, Okayama Prefecture, Japan
- Region: San'yō region

History
- Built: late 6th century

Site notes
- Public access: Yes (no facilities)

Musa Ōtsuka Kofun (牟佐大塚古墳) is a Kofun period burial mound located in the Musa neighborhood of Kita-ku, Okayama, Okayama Prefecture, in the San'yō region of Japan. The tumulus was designated a National Historic Site of Japan in 1930.

== Overview ==
The Musa Ōtsuka Kofun is an enpun (円墳)-style circular tumulus with a diameter of 40 meters and a height of 10 meters, and a huge tunnel-style stone burial chamber with a total length of 18 meters with the opening orientated to the east. It is situated at a strategic location where the ancient route of the San'yōdō highway crosses the Asahi River. The burial chamber is made of megalithic blocks of granite and contains a hollowed-out house-shaped sarcophagus measuring 2.88 meters long, 1.6 meters wide, and 1.5 meters high. The sarcophagus is made of shell limestone quarried at Mount Namigata in Ibara, Okayama. The sarcophagus has a hole, from which its grave goods were robbed in antiquity. It is estimated that the tumulus was built at the end of the 6th century from the shape of the sarcophagus, and it is speculated that this was a mausoleum of the Kibi no Kamimichi clan, a powerful ruling family in ancient Kingdom of Kibi.

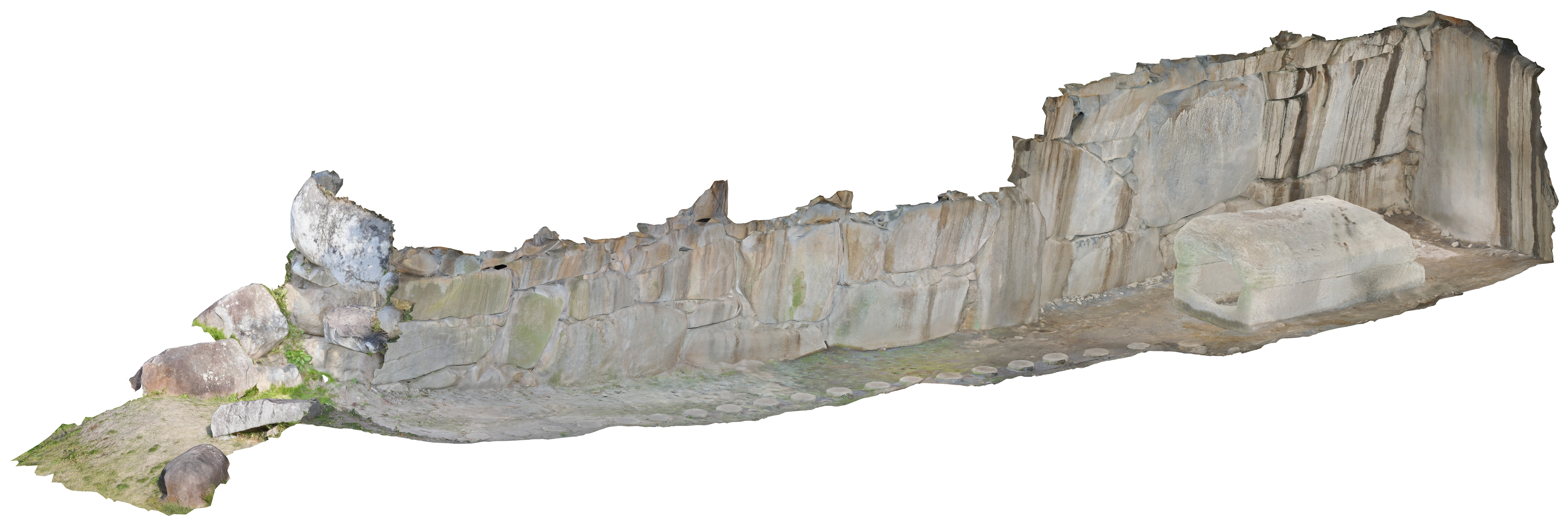
3D computer rendition of the burial chamber and passage

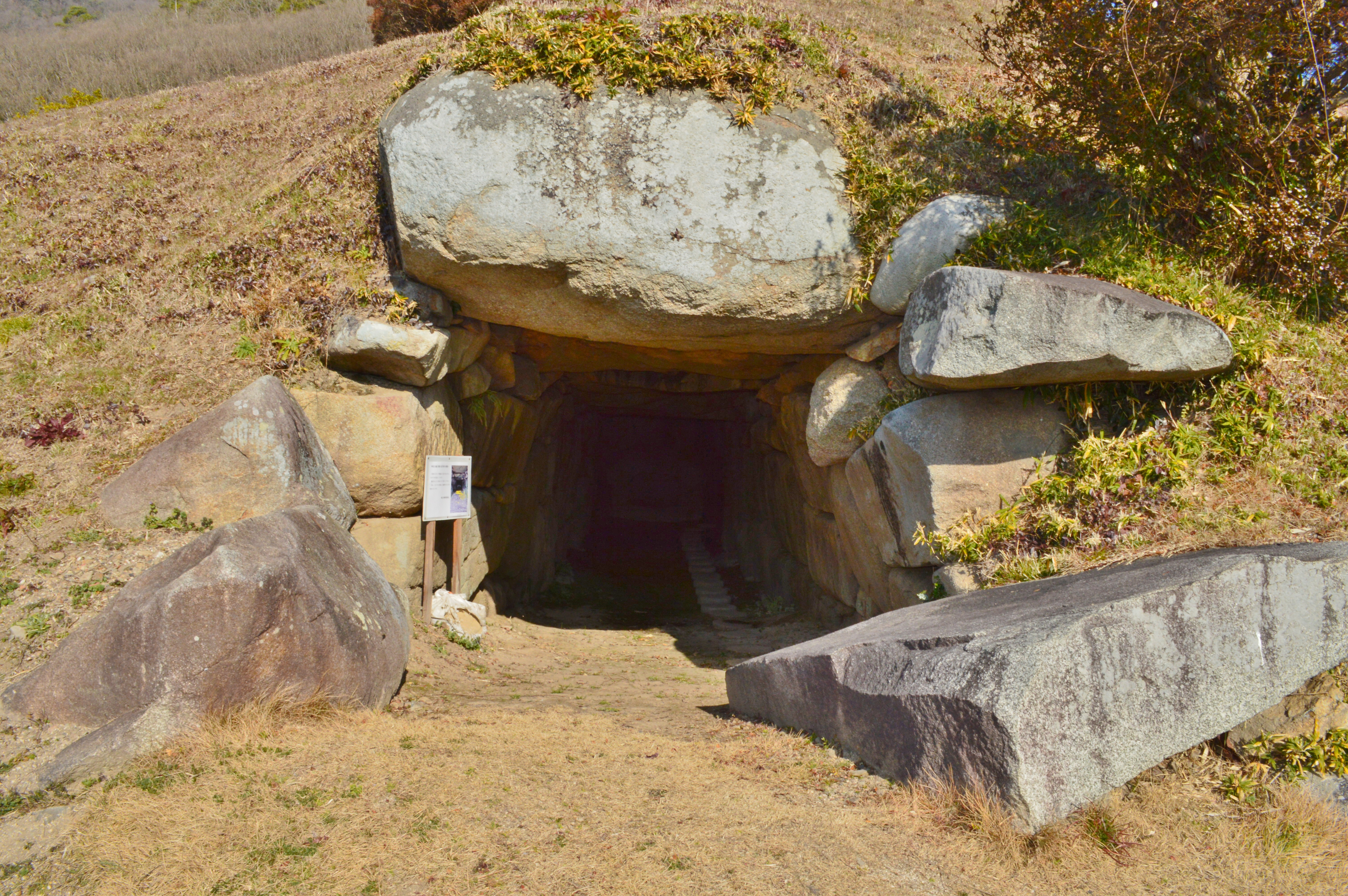
Opening

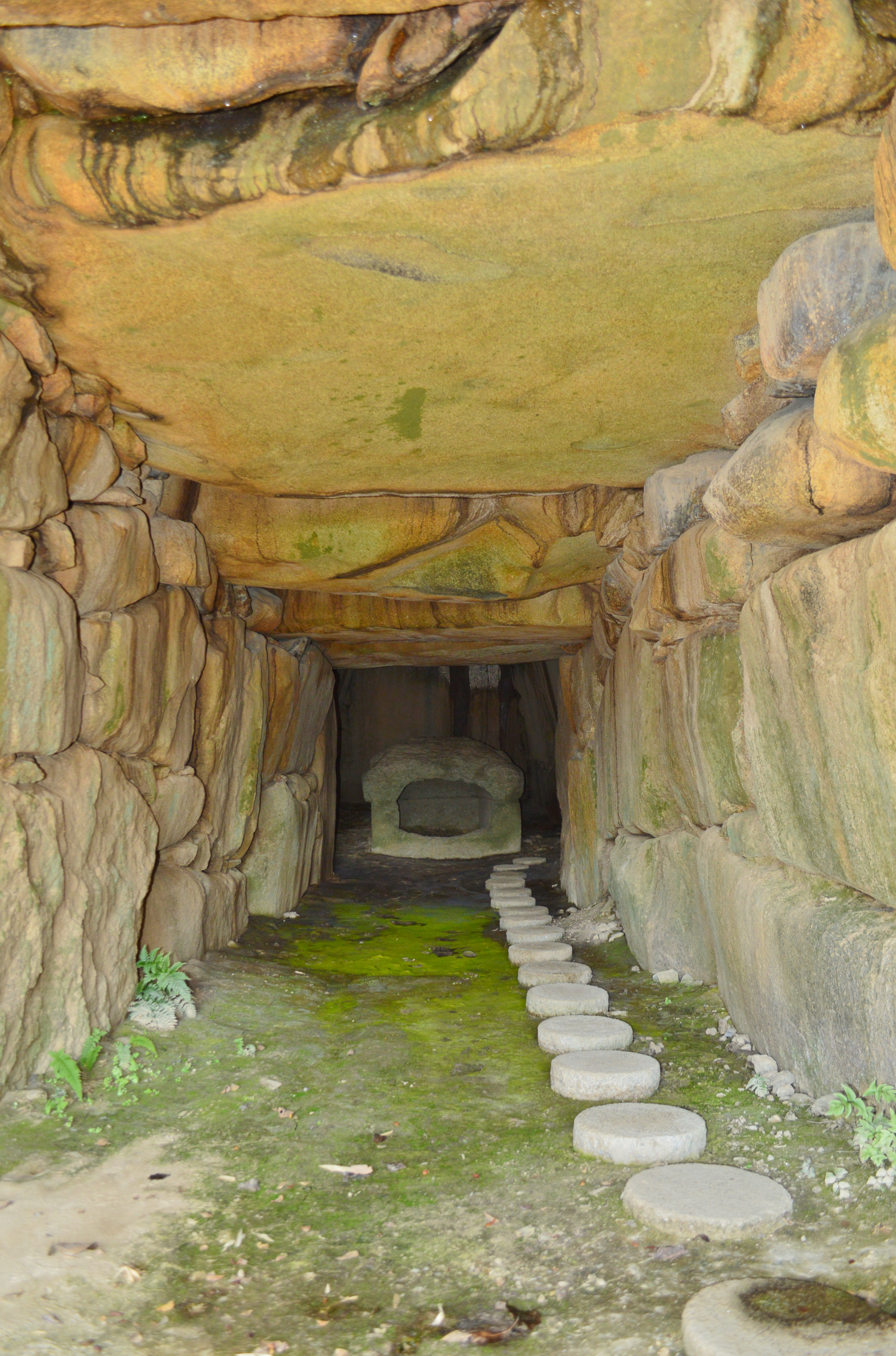
Passage

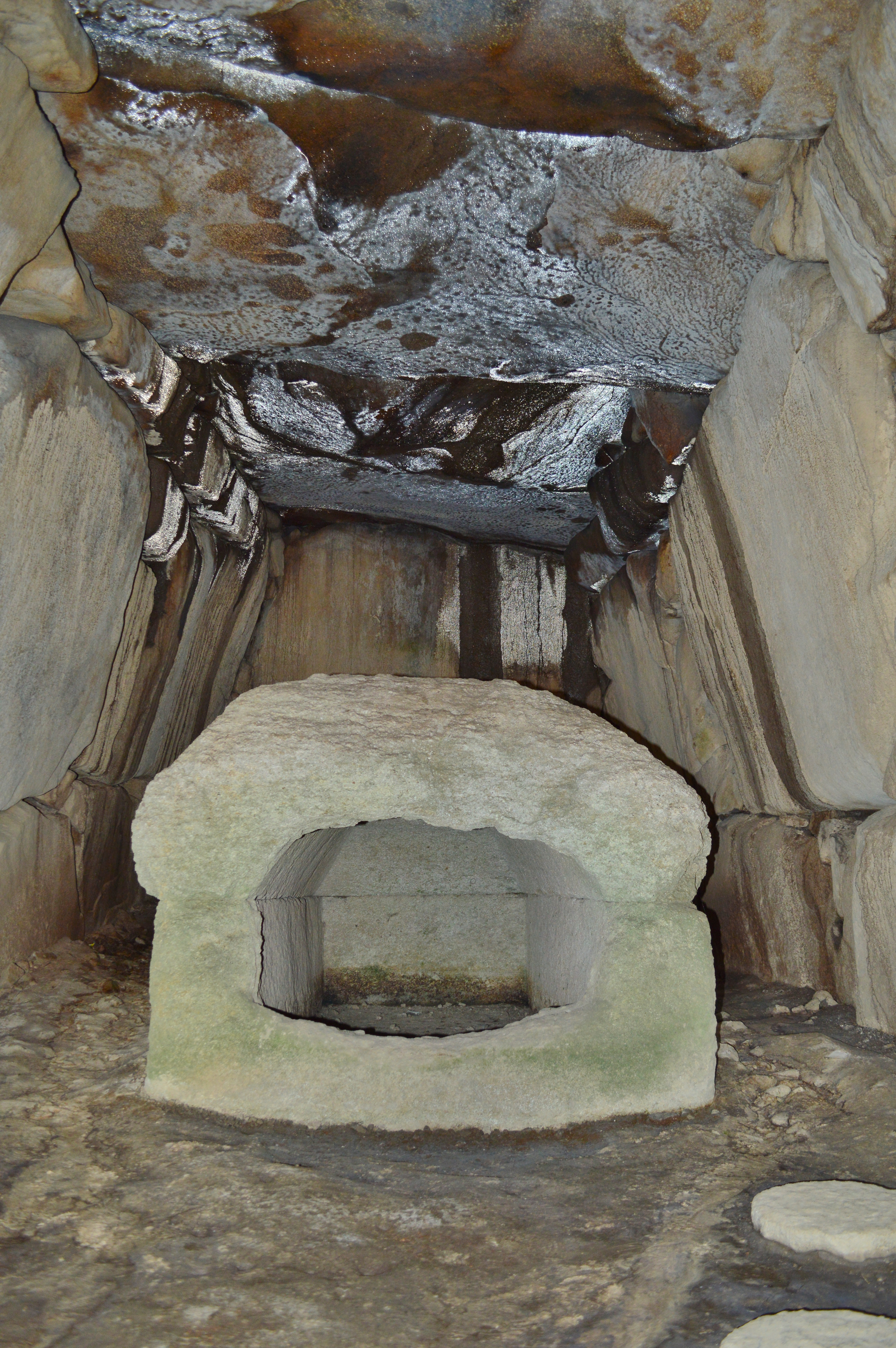
Sarcophagus

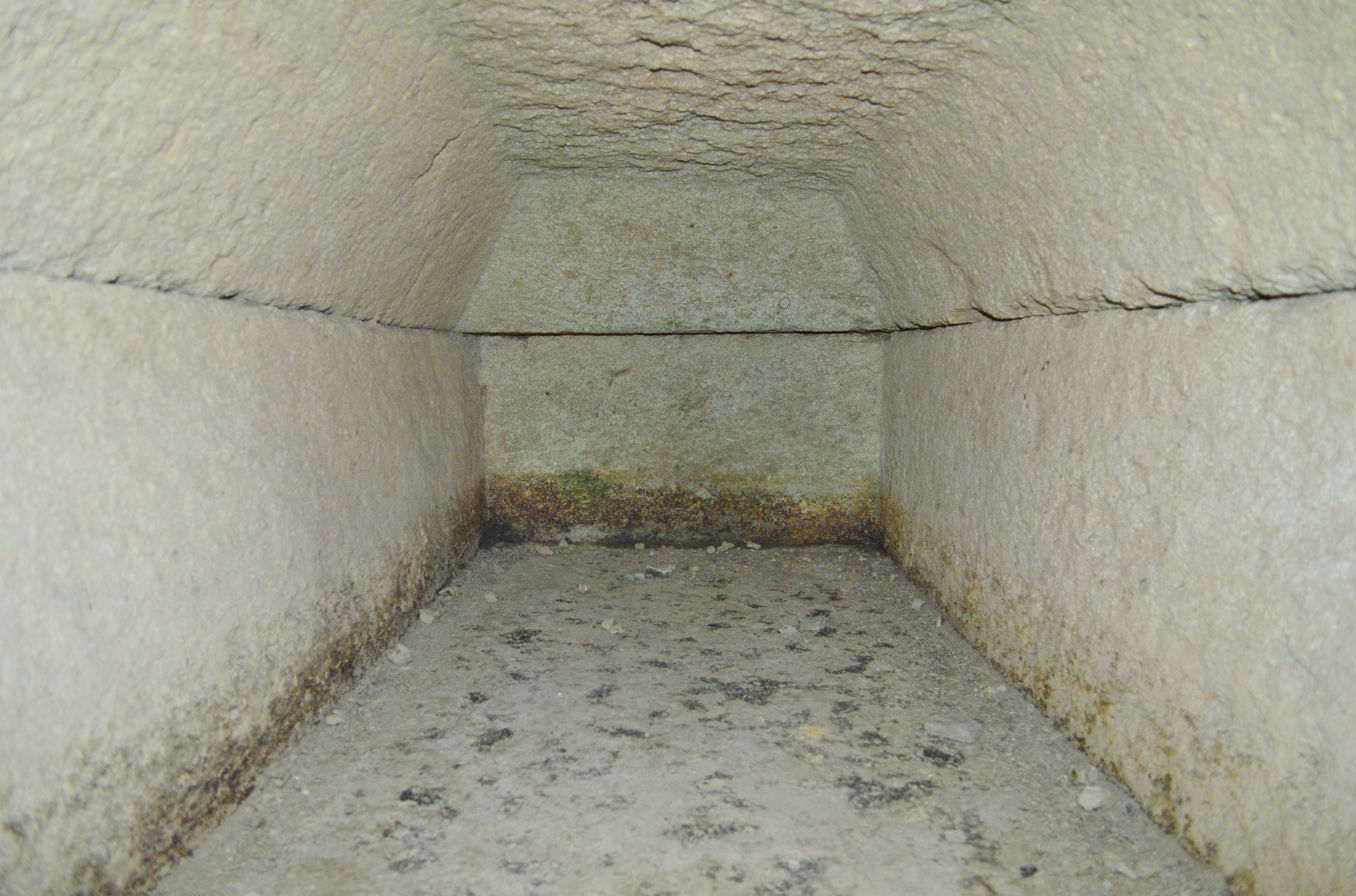
Inside the sarcophagus

== See also ==
- List of Historic Sites of Japan (Okayama)
