= Onoe Kurumayama Kofun =

- 尾上車山古墳 (Japanese)
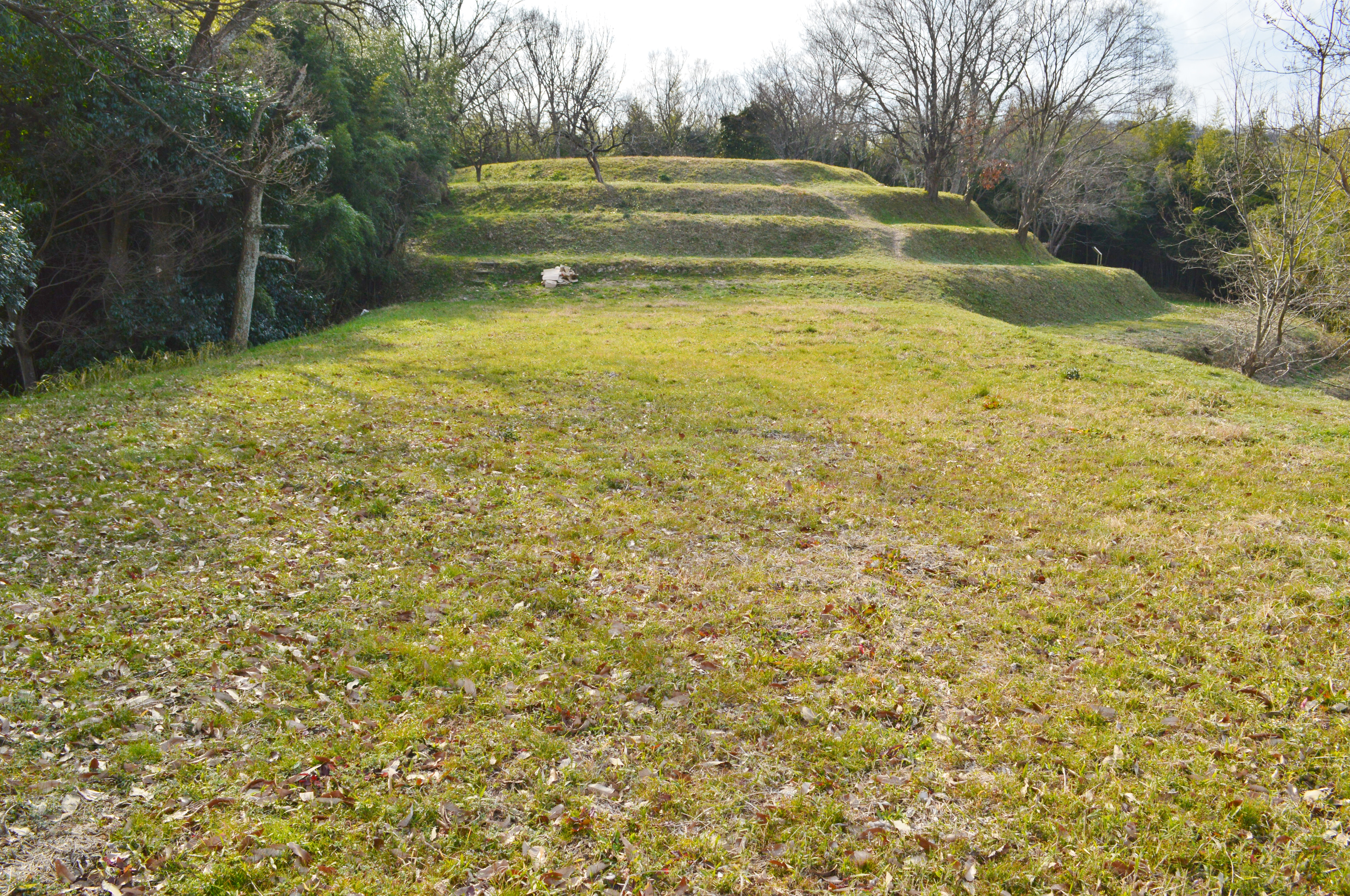
- Onoe Kurumayama Kofun

- Onoe Kurumayama Kofun Onoe Kurumayama Kofun (Japan)
- Interactive map of Onoe Kurumayama Kofun
- 34°39′32.28″N 133°51′54.51″E
- Type: Kofun
- Periods: Kofun period
- Location: Kita-ku, Okayama, Okayama Prefecture, Japan
- Region: San'yō region

History
- Built: mid 4th century

Site notes
- Public access: Yes (no facilities)

Onoe Kurumayama Kofun (尾上車山古墳) is a Kofun period burial mound located in the Onoe neighborhood of Kita-ku, Okayama, Okayama Prefecture, in the San'yō region of Japan. The tumulus was designated a National Historic Site of Japan in 1972. It is also called the "Girigiriyama Kofun" (ぎりぎり山古墳).

== Overview ==
The Onoe Kurumayama Kofun is a zenpō-kōen-fun (前方後円墳), which is shaped like a keyhole when viewed from above. It is located at the southeastern end of Kibi no Nakayama, an independent hill to the west of Okayama city.The tumulus is orientated to the east, has a total length of about 138.5 meters, and a round posterior portion with a diameter of about 96 meters and a height of about 11 meters and was built in three stages. The anterior part has a width of 52 meters, height of nine meters and was built in two stages. Fukiishi and shards of cylindrical haniwa have been found, and it is presumed that there is a 20-meter long extension on the north side of the mound. The tumulus has not been excavated, but has a pit-style stone burial chamber perpendicular to the main axis of the mound in the center of the round posterior portion. Based on its shape and the haniwa uncovered, the tumulus was constructed in the middle or latter half of the 4th century, in the first half of the early Kofun period. As it was situated on the shore of the Seto Inland Sea when completed, it is speculated that it was intended to be seen by maritime traffic as an indication of the power of the ancient Kingdom of Kibi.

Total length
138.5 meters:
Anterior rectangular portion
52 meters wide x 9 meters high x 2 steps
Constriction width
38 meters
Posterior circular portion
96 meter diameter x 11 meters high x 3 steps

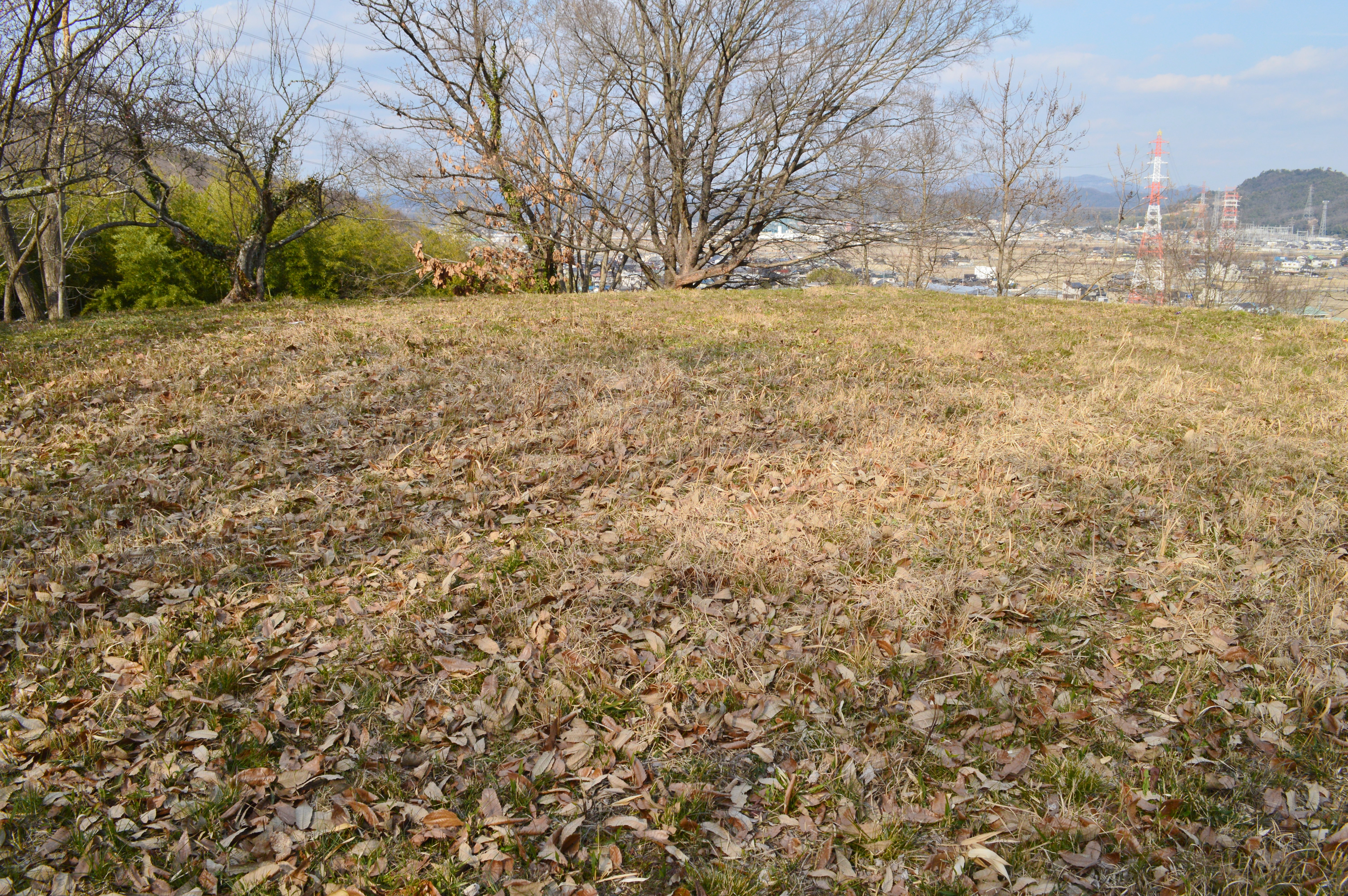
Rear circular mound top

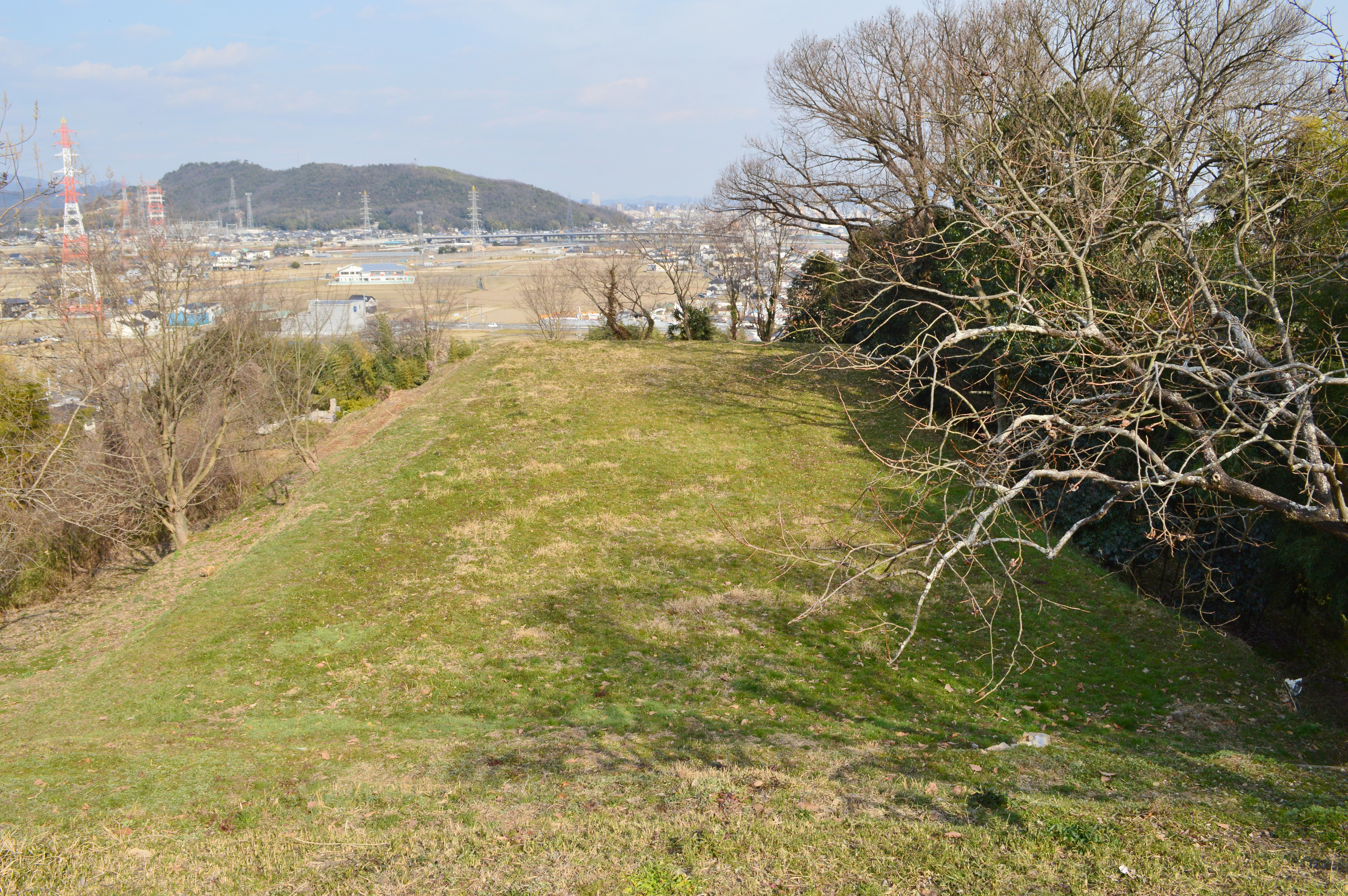
Looking forward from the rear circular part

== See also ==
- List of Historic Sites of Japan (Okayama)
