= Shimotsumichi clan grave =

Nara period burial mound

- 下道氏墓 (Japanese)
- Shimotsumichi clan grave Shimotsumichi clan grave (Japan)
- Interactive map of Shimotsumichi clan grave
- 34°36′59″N 133°37′38″E
- Type: Grave
- Periods: Kofun period
- Location: Yakage, Okayama, Japan
- Region: San'yō region

History
- Built: 7th century

Site notes
- Public access: Yes (no facilities)

Shimotsumichi clan grave (下道氏墓) was a Nara period burial mound located in the town of Yakage, Oda IDistrict, Okayama Prefecture, in the San'yō region of Japan. The it was designated a National Historic Site of Japan in 1923.

== Overview ==
In 1699, a copper funerary urn was discovered in a stone chest in Higashi-Mitsunari hamlet in what is now the town of Yakage. The container had a diameter of 12 cm, a height of 15.8 cm, a lid diameter of 24.7 cm, and a height of 8.8 cm. The inscription on the lid stated that "Shimotsumichi Ason Kunikatsu and Kuyori cremated their mother in Wadō 1" (708 AD). Shimotsumichi Ason Kunikatsu was of the local gōzoku nobility of the former Kingdom of Kibi, and the father of Kibi no Makibi, a noted scholar and diplomat of the Nara period. The burial mound is believed to be the grave of the Shimotsumichi clan. The urn is kept as a temple treasure at the Buddhist temple of Kokushō-ji (圀勝寺)Temple located about one kilometer northwest of the grave site. It is designated as a National Important Cultural Property. The site of the grave is now part of the town's Kibi-no-Makibi Park.

== See also ==
- List of Historic Sites of Japan (Okayama)
