= Miwayama Kofun Cluster =

Kofun period burial mound cluster in Tsuyama, Okayama, Japan

Miwayama Kofun cluster
- 美和山古墳群 (Japanese)
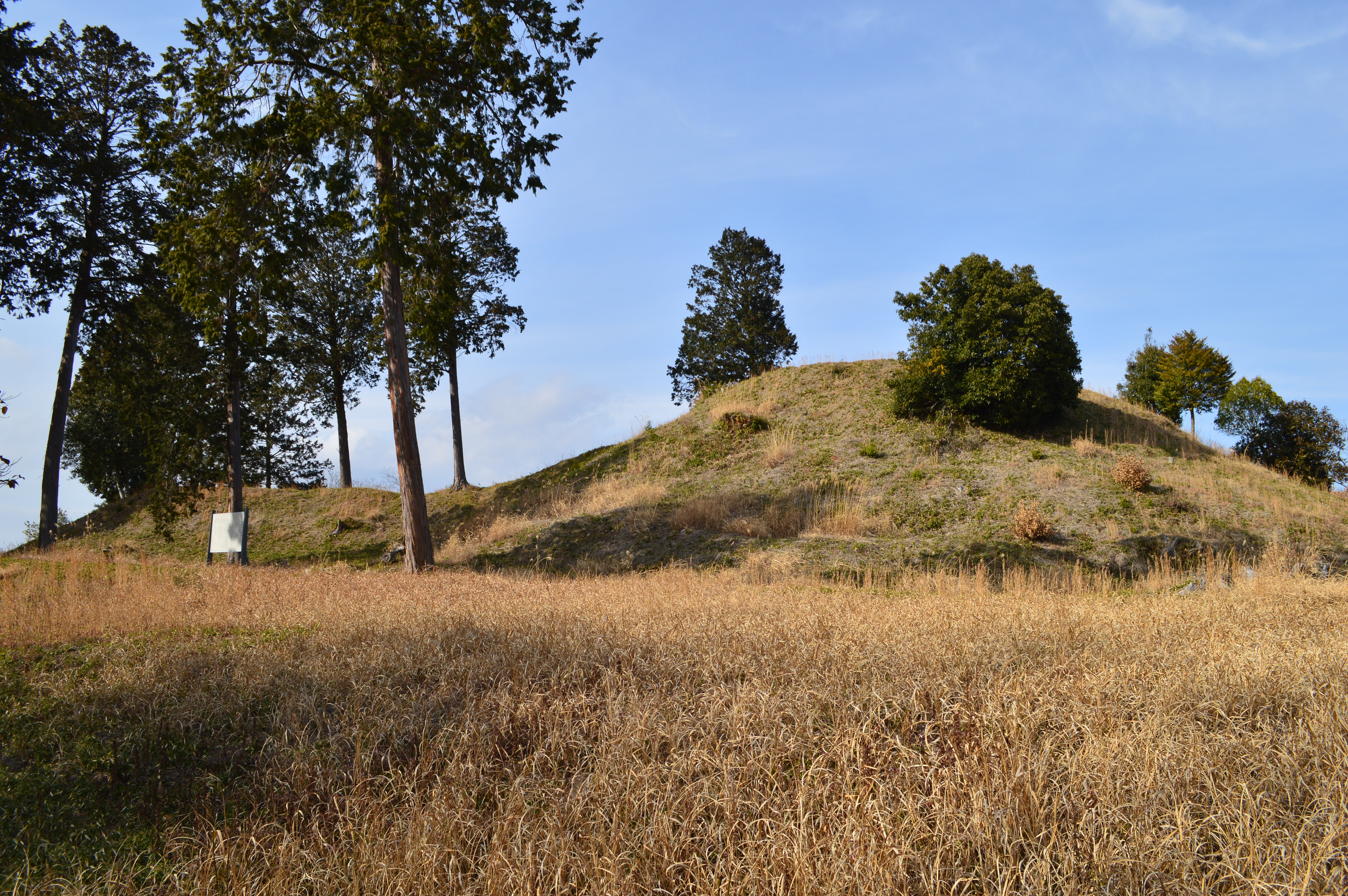
- Miwayama Kofun No.1

- Miwayama Kofun cluster Miwayama Kofun Cluster (Japan)
- Interactive map of Miwayama Kofun cluster
- 35°3′47.04″N 133°57′59.31″E
- Type: Kofun
- Periods: Kofun period
- Location: Tsuyama, Okayama, Japan
- Region: San'yō region

History
- Built: 4th century AD

Site notes
- Public access: Yes

The Miwayama Kofun cluster (美和山古墳群, Miwayama Kofun-gun) is a group of kofun burial mounds located in Ninomiya neighborhood of the city of Tsuyama, Okayama Prefecture, in the San'yō region of Japan. The tumuli were collectively designated a National Historic Site in 2015.

== Background ==
The Miyayama Kofun cluster is located on a hill along the left bank of the Yoshii River to the west of the Tsuyama urban area. The site was initially scheduled to be razed for a housing estate in 1977, but after the discovery of the kofun cluster, a 30,000 square meter area was quickly placed under protection as a National Historic Site for preservation. Within this area are four surviving tumuli. One is a zenpō-kōen-fun (前方後円墳), which is shaped like a keyhole, having one square end and one circular end, when viewed from above. It has a length of 80 meters, making it one of the largest keyhole-shaped burial mounds in the Mimasaka region. The three others are all circular-type (empun (円墳)). Fukiishi remain on some areas of the tumuli. Artifacts excavated include haniwa fragments with patterns drawn by a spatula. From these artifacts, the tumuli are believed to have been built in the 4th century. The tumuli themselves have not been excavated, so details of the burial chambers are unknown.

Miwayama Castle was built on this site during the Sengoku period (14th to 16th centuries), and the east and west overhangs of Miwayama No. 1 are believed to be the remains of Miwayama Castle's earthen walls.

The site is maintained as a park, and is located 15 minutes on foot from Innoshō Station on the JR West Kishin Line.

Miwayama Kofun cluster
Name	Location	Type	Size
Miwayama No.1 Dozuka (胴塚)	35°3′47.04″N 133°57′59.31″E	keyhole	80.5 m long, x 48 m circular portion, 5.3 to 6 m high
Miwayama No.2 Jazuka (蛇塚)	35°3′43.01″N 133°57′58.02″E	circular	34m dia x 6.5m high
Miwayama No.3 Mimizuka (耳塚)	35°3′41.03″N 133°57′57.44″E	circular	36m dia x 5.5 to 6.5m high
Miwayama No.6	35°3′44.07″N 133°57′59.03″E	circular	17m dia x 2.0 m high

== Gallery ==
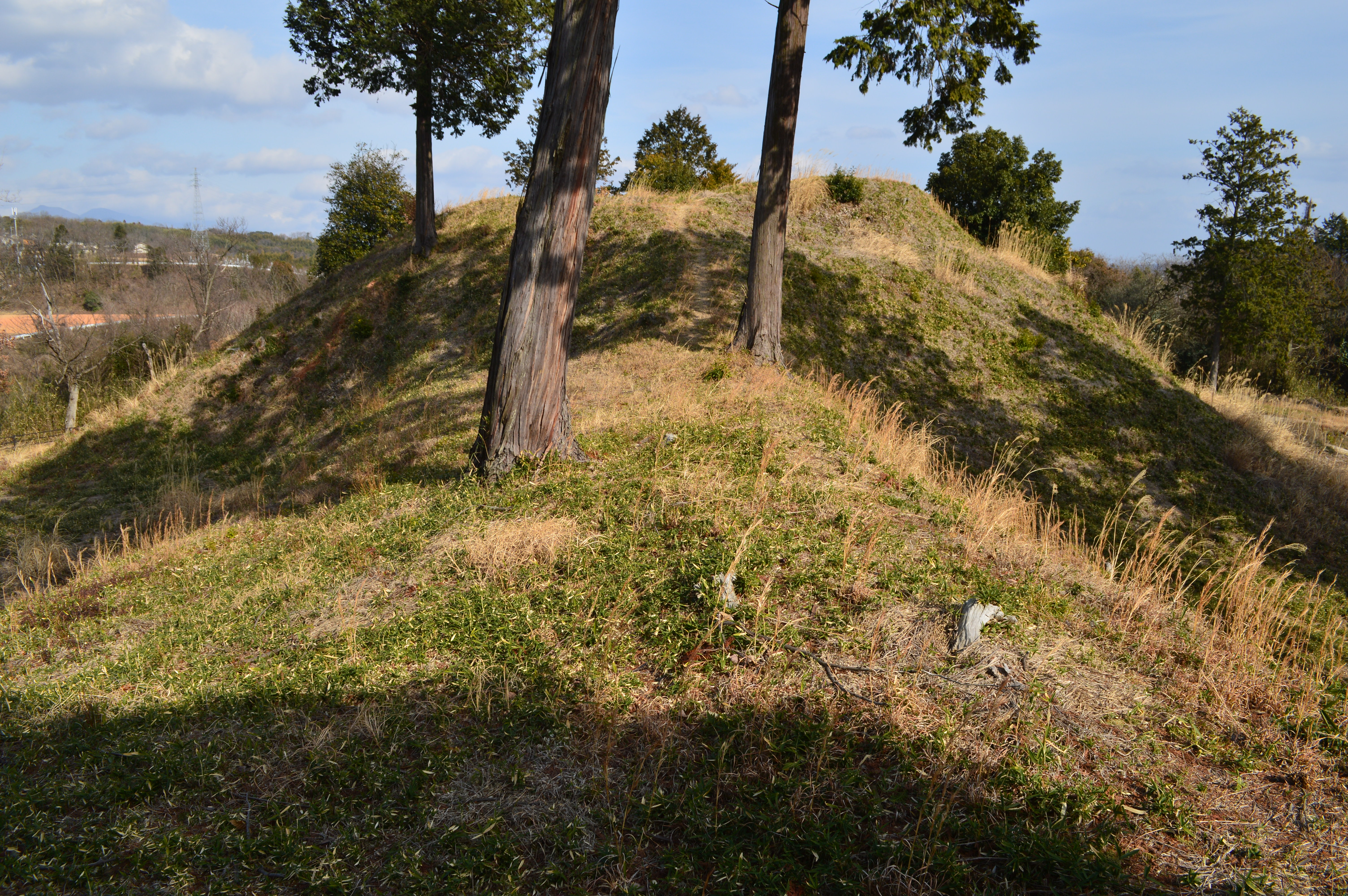
Miwayama No.1 anterior towards posterior

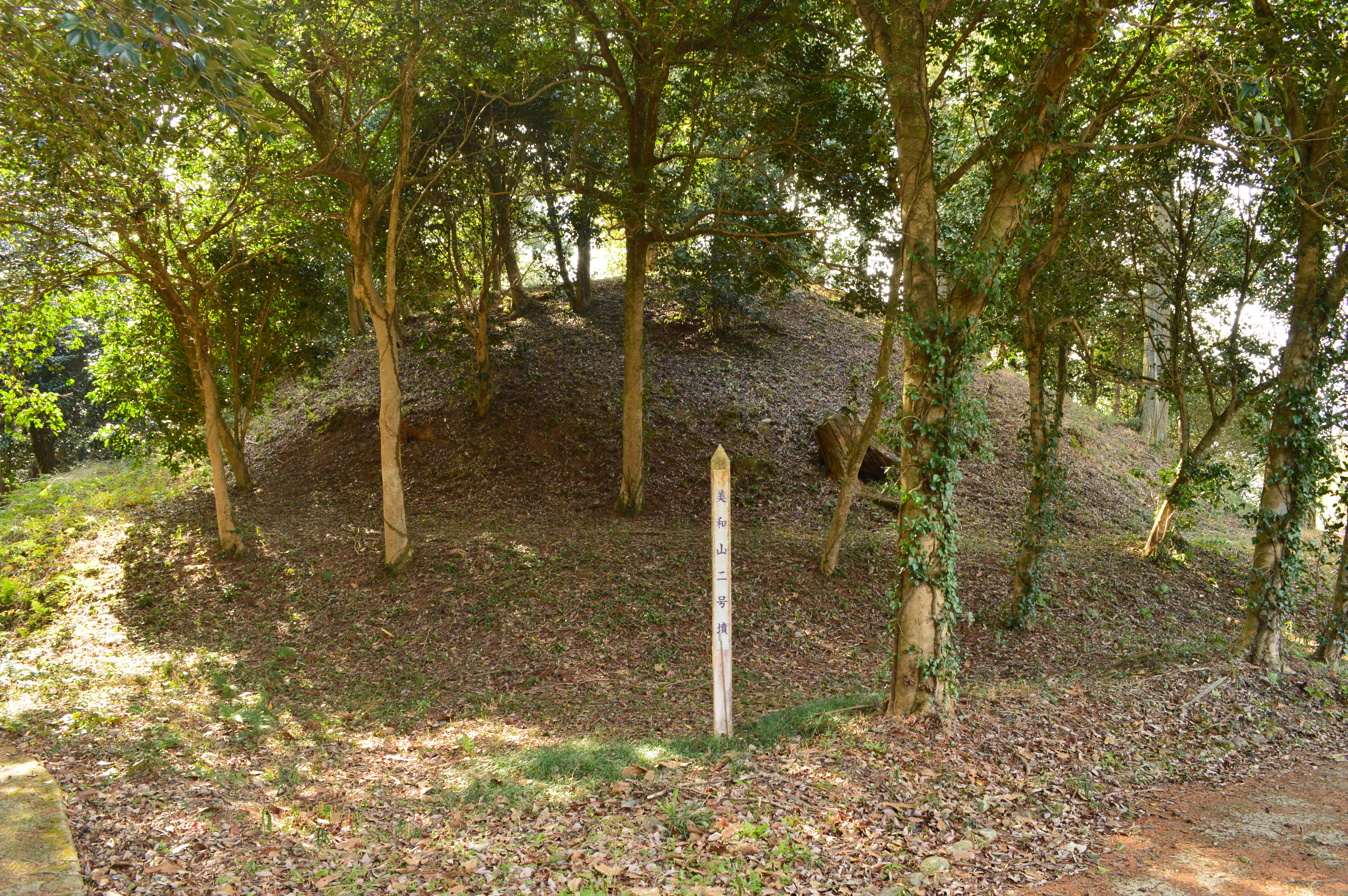
Miwayama No.2

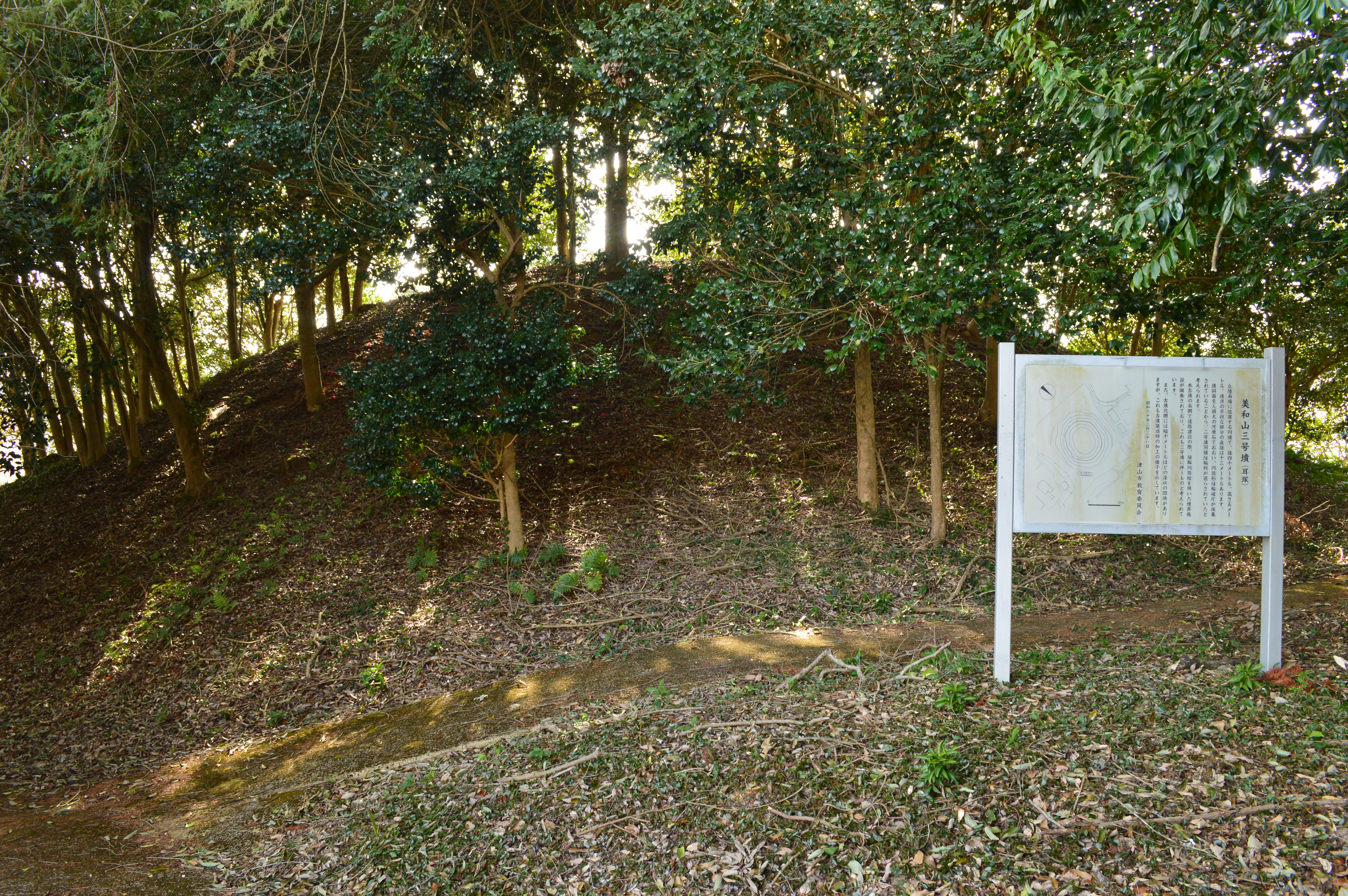
Miwayama No.3

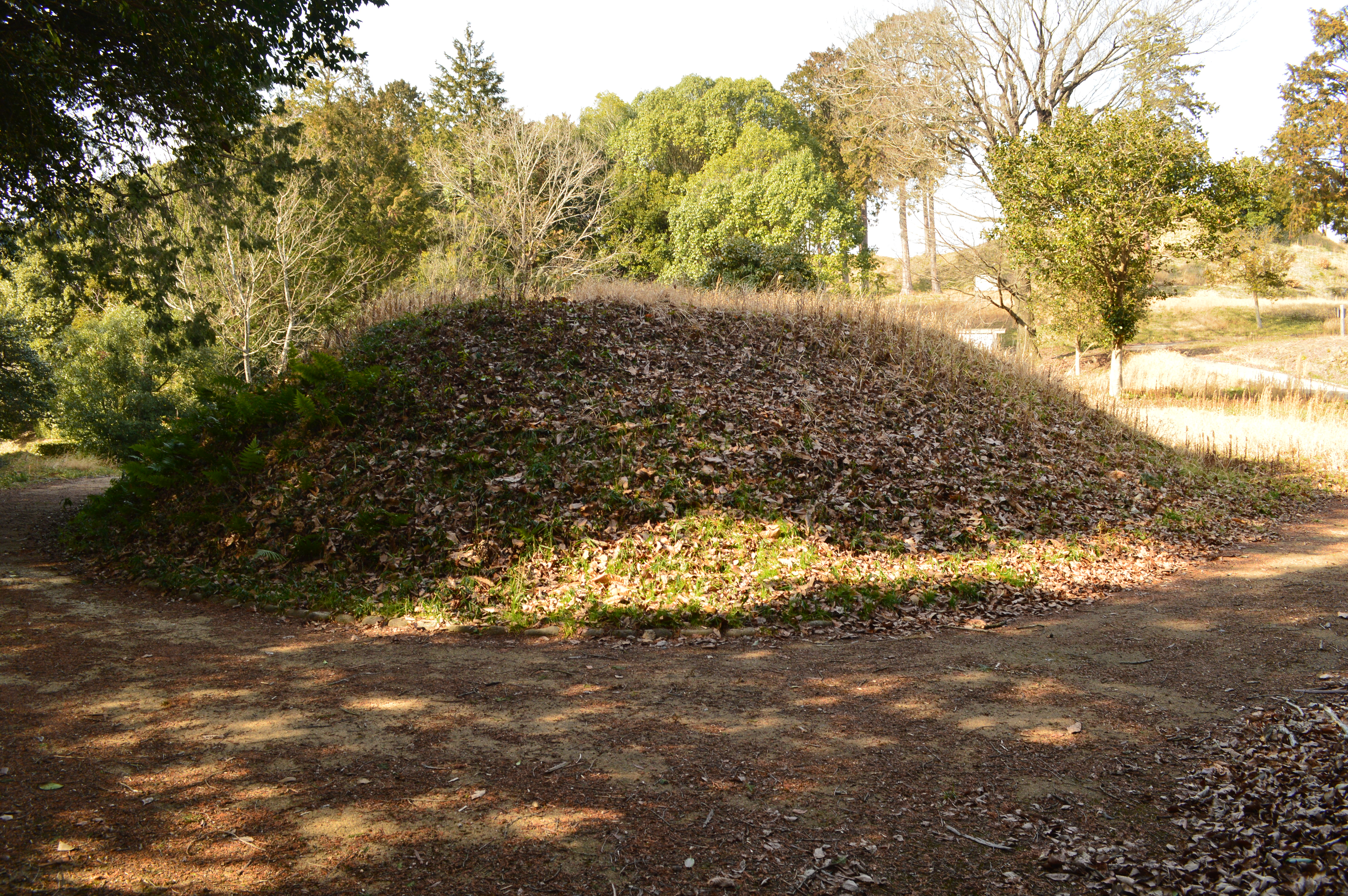
Miwayama No.6

== See also ==
- List of Historic Sites of Japan (Okayama)
