= Sannari Kofun =

Kofun period burial mound and historical site located in the San'yō region of Japan

- 三成古墳 (Japanese)
- Sannari Kofun Sannari Kofun (Japan)
- Interactive map of Sannari Kofun
- 35°04′03″N 133°53′53″E
- Type: kofun
- Periods: Kofun period
- Location: Tsuyama, Okayama Prefecture Japan
- Region: San'yō region

History
- Built: late 4th to early 5th century AD

Site notes
- Public access: Yes (museum)

The Sannari Kofun (三成古墳) is a Kofun period burial mound located in the Nakakitashita neighborhood of the city of Tsuyama, Okayama Prefecture in the San'yō region of Japan. The tumulus was designated a National Historic Site of Japan in 1979.

== Overview ==
The Sannari Kofun is located on the left bank of the Kume River, which flows to the west of the Tsuyama Basin, at the edge of a south-facing hill. It is a "two conjoined rectangles" type (zenpō-kōhō-fun (前方後方墳)) with a length of 35 meters, and orientated to the east. While the north face of the hillside has been shaped only to the extent that it is difficult to distinguish it from the natural topography, the south and west faces facing the Tsuyama Basin are clearly intentionally shaped. In 1977, when the landowner (a Buddhist temple) began to clear the land for the construction of a cemetery, a box-type stone sarcophagus was discovered. Up until this point, it had been unknown that this was an ancient burial mound, and the construction work leveled much of the north side of the tumulus. The south side has relatively preserved its original shape, and fukiishi was confirmed in the posterior portion. In 1978, an archaeological excavation was conducted by the Okayama Prefectural Board of Education.

Box-type sarcophagi made with three flagstones for each side wall and one stone plate for each edge, and three lid stones were found in both the anterior and posterior portions of the tumulus, and are aligned with the main axis of the tumulus. In addition, three more small box-type sarcophaguses, believed to be for infants, were excavated near the rear of the tumulus.

The inside of the first large sarcophagus measured 190 cm long, 45 cm wide and 30 cm deep on average. Inside were two sets of human remains placed facing each other, crossing each other near the thighs. Based on the state of burial, one of the sets of bones appears to have been a subsequent burial. Only the lower set of bones was accompanied by a pillow stone. The human bones were painted vermilion, and the inside of the sarcophagus was also painted with red pigment. The second main burial was also that of a pair of remains, very similar to the first set: however, only the first burial was accompanied by grave goods. These included an iron sword, an iron axe, and a magatama as well as a bronze mirror depicting four beasts and seven pseudo inscriptions. Based on the burial goods and excavated shards of Haji ware pottery, it is believed that the tumulus was built between the end of the 4th century and the beginning of the 5th century.

Restoration work was carried out and the tumulus has regained its original appearance. The excavated artifacts are stored and exhibited at the Tsuyama City Kume Museum of History and Folklore (津山市久米歴史民俗資料館). The tumulus is located about six minutes by car from JR West Kishin Line Mimasaka-Sendai Station.

== See also ==
- List of Historic Sites of Japan (Okayama)
