= Kasagami no Moji-iwa =

Kasagami no moji-iwa
- 笠神の文字岩 (Japanese)
- Kasagami no moji-iwa Kasagami no Moji-iwa (Japan)
- Interactive map of Kasagami no moji-iwa
- 34°49′17″N 133°24′19″E
- Type: Monument
- Periods: Kamakura period
- Location: Takahashi, Okayama, Japan
- Region: San'yō region

History
- Built: 1307

Site notes
- Public access: Yes (no facilities)

Kasagami no Moji-iwa (笠神の文字岩) is a Kamakura period monument located in the Urama neighborhood of Takahashi, Okayama, Okayama Prefecture, in the San'yō region of Japan. It was designated a National Historic Site of Japan in 1941.

== Overview ==
The Nariwa River is an important tributary of the Takahashi River in western Okayama, and in pre-modern times was used for river transport in Bitchū and Bingo Provinces; however, until large-scale civil engineerings projects were undertaken in the Kamakura period, rapids in ten locations on the river made travel hazardous. The Ryuzu Rapids were the most difficult of these locations, and in 1307 a channel to avoid these rapids was constructed. The magistrate in charge of the project was the priest Jissen of Saidai-ji in Nara, with the priest Sonkai of the temple of Zenyo-ji in Nariwa as the local head of construction. The engineer in charge of the project and the masonry work necessary was Ii no Yukitsune, originally a mason from Ningbo in Song China who had been invited to Japan to work on the reconstruction project for Tōdai-ji, and whose descendants continued to be active as stonemasons in the Okayama region. The Kasagami no moji-iwa itself is a large andesite stone, roughly 16 meters in circumference and six meters in height, located in the middle of the river. An inscription is carved on this stone detailing the history of the construction work. The Kasagami-no-moji-iwa is regarded as "The oldest monument in the history of the development of water transport in Japan". It was designated a National Historic Site in 1941; however, it was submerged by the completion of the Shin-Nariwagawa Dam and only appears during the dry season.

Currently, a full-size imitation stone is displayed along the prefectural road. It is approximately 40 minutes by car from Bitchū Takahashi Station on the JR West Hakubi Line.

== See also ==
- List of Historic Sites of Japan (Okayama)
