= Ezaki Kofun =

Kofun period burial mound in Sōja, Okayama, Japan

- 江崎古墳 (Japanese)
- Ezaki Kofun (Rear circular section and opening on the right, front rectangular section in the back left)

- Ezaki Kofun Ezaki Kofun (Japan)
- Interactive map of Ezaki Kofun
- 34°40′6.72″N 133°46′36.90″E
- Type: Kofun
- Periods: Kofun period
- Location: Kamibayashi-Ezaki-cho, Sōja, Okayama, Japan
- Region: Chugoku region

History
- Built: late 6th-erly 7th century

Site notes
- Public access: yes
- Okayama Prefecture Historic Site

The Ezaki Kofun (江崎古墳), is a Kofun period burial mound, located in the Kamibayashi-Ezaki neighborhood of the city of Sōja, Okayama Prefecture in the Chugoku region of western Japan. The tumulus was designated a Okayama Prefecture Historic Site in 1986.

== Overview ==
The Ezaki Kofun is constructed on a sloping hillside at the foot of a mountain. The tumulus is a zenpō-kōen-fun (前方後円墳), which is shaped like a keyhole, having one square end and one circular end, when viewed from above. The rectangular anterior section is at a higher elevation than the circular posterior section, and the main axis of the tumulus oriented north-south. It is a two-tiered structure, measuring 45 meters in total length, approximately 32 meters in diameter and 5.2 meters in height for the circular section, 25 meters in width and 1.2 meters in height for the rectangular front section. A moat, 3.0-5.8 meters wide and 0.8-1.6 meters deep, is visible from the northern half of the circular section to the rectangular section. While small quantities of haniwa clay figures have been unearthed, the number of fragments is remarkably small, suggesting that they were erected only in very limited or sparse areas. Cylindrical haniwa, morning glory-shaped haniwa, and figurative haniwa were identified, but only one piece Sue ware pottery has been found.

The burial chamber is located slightly south of the center of the circular section and is a double-chambered horizontal-entry stone chamber constructed of natural stones, opening almost to the west. The side walls are made of large granite blocks stacked in two or three layers, with smaller stones filling the gaps, while the back wall consists of a single large granite monolith. The ceiling stones, except for three located from the entrance to the passage, were lost early on, and at the time of the 1984 archaeological excavation, the burial chamber was filled with soil and debris. The total length of the burial chamber is 13.8 meters, with the chamber proper 6.6 meters long and 2.6 meters wide at the back wall narrowing to 2.3 meters at the side walls. The height of the burial chamber is 2.9 meters at the back wall and 2.66 meters to the existing ceiling stone. The entrance passage is 1.7 meters wide and 2.5 meters high, while the entrance to the burial chamber is lower, measuring 1.9 meters in height. The floor area of the burial chamber is 16 square meters, approximately 60 percent of the floor area of the Komorizuka Kofun.

A house-shaped stone sarcophagus, carved out of the wall, occupies almost the center of the burial chamber, close to the right wall. There are two rope-hanging protrusions on each long side of the lid and one on each short side. The rope-hanging protrusions are attached to the sloping surface of the lid, are small and flat, and have no practical function. The southeast corner of the lid is damaged enough for a person to enter, indicating tomb robbery. The coffin body measures 238 cm on the long side of the upper edge, 131 cm on the short side, 238 cm on the long side of the base, 125 cm on the short side, 68 cm in height, and 46 cm in depth. The lid measures 251 cm on the long side, 143 cm on the short side, 43 cm in height, and 16 cm in depth, with a slight bulge in the center of both the long and short sides. The stone material is shell limestone, the same as the stone coffin of the Komorizuka Kofun.

The stone coffin contained the remains of two people. Although their original positions were significantly disturbed by looting, one remains are estimated to be those of a middle-aged male, estimated to be in his late 20s to 30s. His height is estimated to be approximately 156-157 cm. The other remains are estimated to be those of a middle-aged female, estimated to be in her late 30s to close to 40s, based on the more advanced tooth wear compared to the male remains. Her height is thought to be approximately the same as that of the male.

Grave goods unearthed from inside the coffin included 30 horse trapping ornaments, one fragment believed to be a cloud-shaped ornament, a knife, a pair of gold rings, approximately 110 glass beads, and fragments of Sue ware. The horse trappings are thought to have originally been outside the coffin but were mixed in when soil that had already flowed into the burial chamber was moved inside during the looting. One bronze mirror plate and one handle were found on the lid of the stone coffin, which are thought to have been discarded during the looting. From inside the burial chamber, bronze mirrors, earrings, iron swords, iron arrowheads, knives, bridles, cloud-shaped ornaments, decorative fittings, shiode (a type of ornament), Sue ware, and Haji ware pottery were unearthed. The bronze mirror is a 14.1 cm diameter animal-motif mirror. Five iron swords were unearthed, including those found inside the stone coffin. 131 iron arrowheads were found on the floor of the stone chamber, and one was found inside the sarcophagus. Two knives were found on the floor of the stone chamber, and two were found inside the sarcophagus. The bridle was made of iron and had a gilded bronze plate with a cross-shaped decoration. The saddle was made of an iron washer 7-7.5 cm in diameter with an iron clasp and had rivets in four places. The cloud-shaped ornament was made of iron with gilded bronze and had eight legs, with an octagonal plan shape. The tsuji-nagusa had a structure very similar to the cloud-shaped ornament, but only had four legs. The decorative metal fittings found inside the sarcophagus and elsewhere included both iron-plated and silver-plated items, and both are thought to have been used attached to leather belts. The 110 glass beads found inside the sarcophagus came in two types, blue and brown, and were 4-5 mm in diameter. Approximately 80 Sue ware pieces were unearthed from the floor of the burial chamber, including bowls, pedestaled bowls, pedestaled bowls with lids, vases, pitchers, long-necked jars with pedestals, wide-mouthed jars, and pedestals. Other pottery found included Haji ware jars, pedestaled bowls, pots, and small urns.

The unearthed Sue ware is estimated to date from the late 6th to early 7th centuries, suggesting that this tumulus was constructed slightly later than the Komorizuka Kofun. Furthermore, the concentration of Sue ware exhibiting a new phase in the back wall suggests that a secondary burial took place. Within the burial chamber, a double-handled jar, green-glazed pottery, and black-interior pottery belonging to the late Heian period were unearthed. Cremated bones were found inside the double-handled jar, suggesting that the burial chamber was reused for cremation burials during the Heian period.

Total length
45 meters
Anterior rectangular portion
35 meters wide x 1.2 meters high, 2-tier
Posterior circular portion
32 meter diameter x 5.2 meters high, 2-tiers

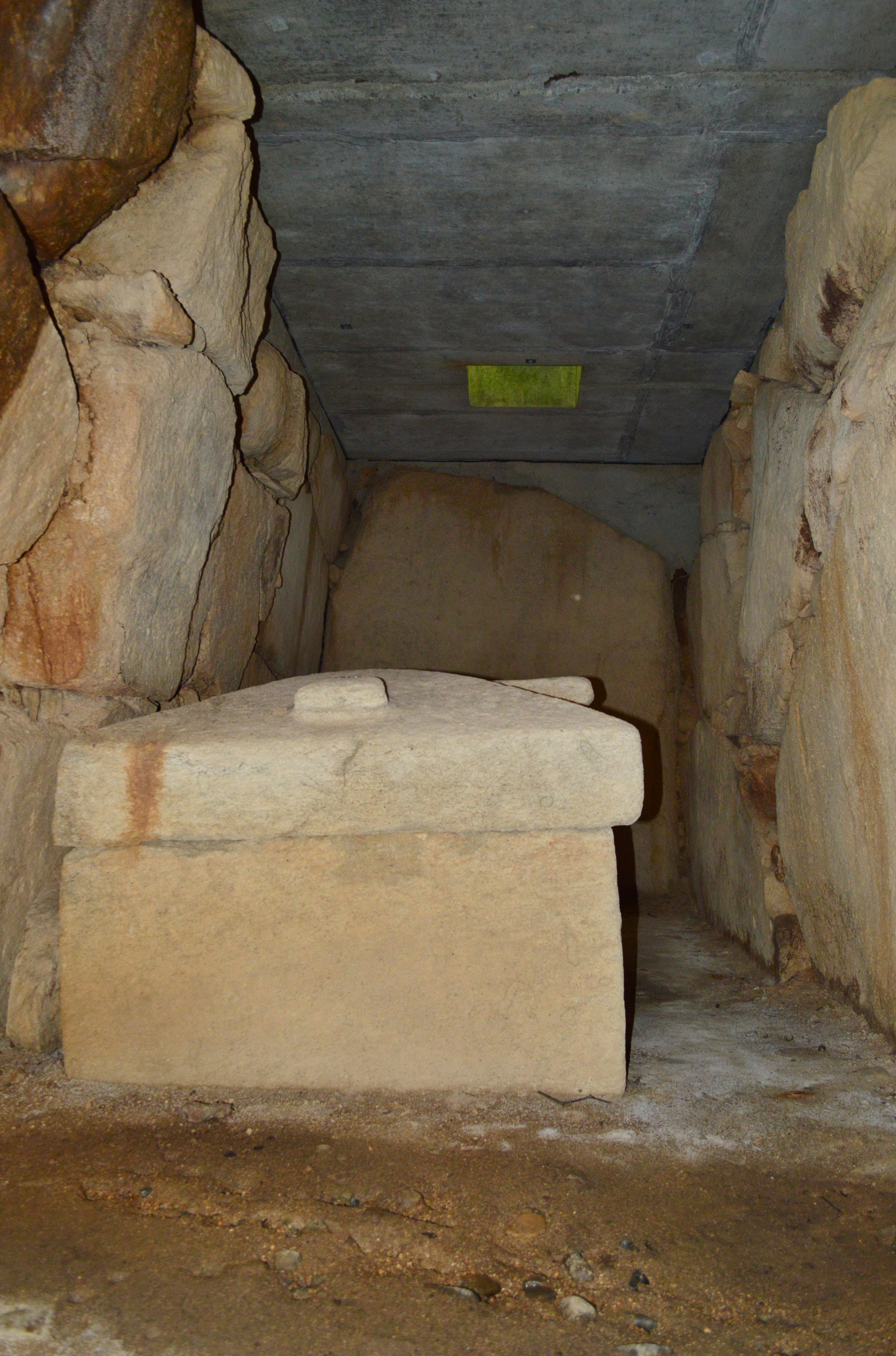
Burial Chamber

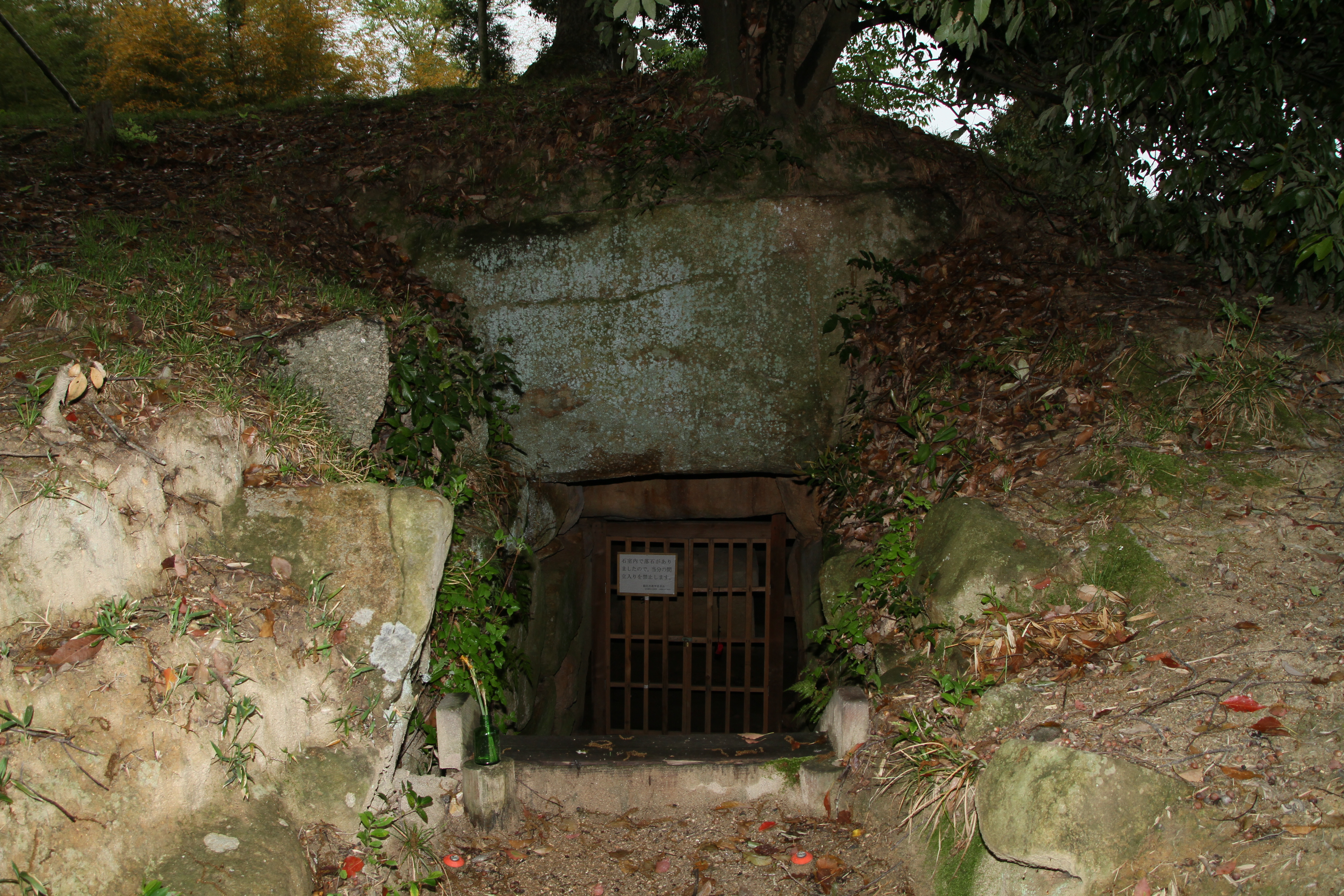
Opening

The tumulus is approximately 5.6 kilometers east of Sōja Station on the JR West Hakubi Line.

== See also ==
- List of Historic Sites of Japan (Okayama)
