= List of historic sites of Japan (Okayama) =

This list is of the historic sites of Japan located within the Prefecture of Okayama.

== National Historic Sites ==
As of 19 June 2026, forty-eight Sites have been designated as being of national significance (including one *Special Historic Site); the Joseon Mission Sites includes sites in Hiroshima and Shizuoka Prefectures.

Site	Municipality	Comments	Image	Coordinates	Type	Ref.
*Former Shizutani School 旧閑谷学校 附 椿山・石門・津田永忠宅跡及び黄葉亭 kyū-Shizutani gakkō tsuketari Tsubakiyama・sekimon・Tsuda Nagatada taku ato oyobi kōyōtei	Bizen	designation includes Tsubakiyama, a stone gate, the site of Tsuda Nagatada Residence, and Kōyōtei	Former Shizutani Site	34°47′47″N 134°13′12″E	4	2242
Kōmorizuka Kofun こうもり塚古墳 Kōmori kofun	Sōja	Kofun period tumulus	Kōmori Kofun	34°40′02″N 133°47′10″E	1	2286
Innoshō Fortified Residence Site 院庄館跡（児島高徳伝説地） Innoshō yakata ato (Kojima Takanori densetsu-chi)	Tsuyama	Muromachi period shugo fortified residence	Innoshō Fortified Residence Site	35°03′43″N 133°56′35″E	8	2244
Urama Chausuyama Kofun 浦間茶臼山古墳 Urama Chausuyama kofun	Higashi-ku, Okayama	Kofun period tumulus	Urama Chausuyama Kofun	34°42′37″N 134°04′02″E	1	2293
Okayama Castle Site 岡山城跡 Okayama-jō ato	Kita-ku, Okayama	Edo Period castle	Okayama Castle Site	34°39′54″N 133°56′10″E	2, 8	2304
Okayama Domain Ikeda clan cemetery 岡山藩主池田家墓所 附 津田永忠墓 Okayama-han shu Ikeda-ke bosho tsuketari Tsuda Nagatada haka	Okayama, Bizen, Wake	Edo Period daimyo cemetery; designation includes the grave of Tsuda Nagatada	Okayama Domain Ikeda Clan cemetery	34°39′35″N 133°58′22″E	7	3223
Shimotsumichi clan grave 下道氏墓 Shimotsumichi uji no haka	Yakage	Nara period tomb		34°36′59″N 133°37′38″E	1, 7	2247
Kasagami no Moji-iwa 笠神の文字岩 Kasagami nomoji-iwa	Takahashi	Kamakura period monument		34°49′17″N 133°24′19″E	5,7	2272
Sabukaze Kiln Sites 寒風古窯跡群 Sabukaze koyō seki-gun	Setouchi	Kofun to Heian period Sue ware kiln ruins	Sabukaze Old Kiln Sites	34°39′17″N 134°08′13″E	6	2302
Tsuruyama Maruyama Kofun 鶴山丸山古墳 Tsuruyama Maruyama kofun	Bizen	Kofun period tumulus		34°43′28″N 134°07′13″E	1	2282
Ki Castle Mountain 鬼城山 Ki-no-jō-san	Sōja	Asuka period fortification ruins	Ki Castle Mountain	34°43′38″N 133°45′59″E	2	2303
Former Okayama Domain Han School 旧岡山藩藩学 kyū-Okayama-han hangaku	Kita-ku, Okayama	Edo Period han school	Former Okayama Domain Han School	34°40′03″N 133°55′38″E	4	2243
Kumayama ruins 熊山遺跡 Kumayama iseki	Akaiwa	Asuka period temple ruins	Kumayama ruins	34°45′15″N 134°07′15″E	3	2279
Takamatsu Castle ruins 高松城跡 附 水攻築提跡 Takamatsu-jō tsuketari Mizuzeme chikutei ato	Kita-ku, Okayama	Sengoku period castle ruins	Takamatsu Castle ruins	34°41′09″N 133°49′38″E	2	2260
Tsukuriyama Kofun 作山古墳 第一古墳 Tsukuriyama kofun	Sōja	Kofun period tumulus	Tsukuriyama Kofun	34°39′53″N 133°46′10″E	1	2241
Sannari Kofun 三成古墳 Sannari kofun	Tsuyama	Kofun period tumulus		35°04′03″N 133°53′53″E	1	2298
Yotsuzuka Kofun Cluster 四ツ塚古墳群 Yotsuzuka kofun-gun	Maniwa	Kofun period tumulus		35°17′49″N 133°43′01″E	1	2259
Tatetsuki Site 楯築遺跡 Tatetsuki iseki	Kurashiki	Yayoi period tumulus	Tatetsuki Site	34°39′47″N 133°49′32″E	1	2300
Shōda temple ruins 賞田廃寺跡 Shōda Haiji ato	Naka-ku, Okayama	Asuka period temple ruins	Shōda Haiji Site	34°41′54″N 133°57′41″E	3	2290
Magane Ichirizuka 真金一里塚 Magane ichirizuka	Kita-ku, Okayama	Edo Period milestone	Magane Ichirizuka	34°40′37″N 133°51′00″E	6	2256
Jingūjiyama Kofun 神宮寺山古墳 Jingūjiyama kofun	Kita-ku, Okayama	Kofun period tumulus	Jingūjiyama Kofun	34°41′02″N 133°55′50″E	1	2283
Yata Ōtsuka Kofun 箭田大塚古墳 Yata Ōtsuka kofun	Kurashiki	Kofun period tumulus	Yata Ōtsuka Kofun	34°38′08″N 133°40′53″E	1	2258
Sōzume Tō Site 惣爪塔跡 Sōzume tō ato	Kita-ku, Okayama	Asuka period temple ruins		34°40′04″N 133°49′35″E	3	2255
Tsukuriyama Kofun 造山古墳 第一、二、三、四、五、六古墳 Tsukuriyama kofun	Kita-ku, Okayama	Kofun period tumuli cluster	Tsukuriyama Kofun	34°40′18″N 133°48′01″E	1	2240
Ōmeguri-Komeguri Mountain Castle ruins 大廻小廻山城跡 Ōmeguri-Komeguri sanjō ato	Higashi-ku, Okayama	Asuka period fortification ruins	Ōmeguri-Komeguri Mountain Castle ruins	34°43′15″N 134°01′13″E	3	3421
Ōdara Yosemiya ruins 大多羅寄宮跡 Ōdara Yosemiya ato	Higashi-ku, Okayama	Edo Period shrine ruins	Ōdara Yosemiya ruins	34°40′08″N 134°00′30″E	3	2250
Ōya-Sada Kofun Cluster 大谷・定古墳群 Ōya-Sada kofun-gun	Maniwa	Kofun period tumuli cluster	Ōya-Sada Kofun Cluster	34°56′32″N 133°37′51″E	1	00003575
Tsukumo Shell Mound 津雲貝塚 Tsukumo kaizuka	Kasaoka	Jomon period shell midden	Tsukumo Shell Mound	34°29′03″N 133°31′59″E	1	2288
Tsuyama Castle ruins 津山城跡 Tsuyama-jō ato	Tsuyama	Edo Period castle ruins	Tsuyama Castle ruins	35°03′46″N 134°00′19″E	2	2285
Tsushima Site 津島遺跡 Tsushima iseki	Kita-ku, Okayama	Yayoi period settlement ruins	Tsushima Site	34°40′46″N 133°55′01″E	1	2289
Hata temple ruins Pagoda Site 幡多廃寺塔跡 Hata Haiji tō ato	Naka-ku, Okayama	Asuka period temple ruins	Hata temple ruins Pagoda Site	34°40′52″N 133°57′42″E	3	2277
Bizen Kokubun-ji ruins 備前国分寺跡 Bizen Kokubunji ato	Akaiwa	Nara period provincial temple of Bizen Province	Bizen Kokubunji ruins	34°44′20″N 133°59′58″E	3	2295
Bizen pottery kiln ruins 備前陶器窯跡 Bizen tōki kama ato	Bizen	Muromachi to Edo period kiln ruins	Bizen pottery kiln ruins	34°44′11″N 134°09′36″E	1, 6	2284
Bitchū Kokubun-ji ruins 備中国分寺跡 Bitchū Kokubunji ato	Sōja	Nara period provincial temple of Bitchū Province	Bitchū Kokubunji ruins	34°40′00″N 133°46′56″E	3	2287
Bitchū Kokubunni-ji ruins 備中国分尼寺跡 Bitchū Kokubunniji ato	Sōja	Nara period provincial nunnery of Bitchū Province	Bitchū Kokubunniji ruins	34°40′04″N 133°47′19″E	3	2246
Bitchū Matsuyama Castle ruins 備中松山城跡 Bitchū Matsuyama-jō ato	Takahashi	Edo Period castle ruins	Bitchū Matsuyama Castle ruins	34°48′32″N 133°37′20″E	2	2280
Onoe Kurumayama Kofun 尾上車山古墳 Onoe Kurumayama kofun	Kita-ku, Okayama	Kofun period tumulus	Onoe Kurumayama Kofun	34°39′32″N 133°51′55″E	1	2291
Mimasaka Kokubun-ji ruins 美作国分寺跡 Mimasaka Kokubunji ato	Tsuyama	Nara period provincial temple of Mimasaka Province	Mimasaka Kokubunji ruins	35°03′00″N 134°02′28″E	3	3434
Miwayama Kofun Cluster 美和山古墳群 Miwayama kofun-gun	Tsuyama	Kofun period tumuli cluster	Miwayama Kofun Cluster	35°03′48″N 133°58′00″E	1	2297
Hikozaki Shell Mound 彦崎貝塚 Hikozaki kaizuka	Minami-ku, Okayama	Jomon period shell midden		34°32′58″N 133°50′07″E	1	00003576
Fukuyama Castle ruins 福山城跡 Fukuyama-jō ato	Sōja	Nanboku-chō period castle ruins	Fukuyama Castle ruins	34°38′47″N 133°45′35″E	2	2270
Mantomi Tōdai-ji Tile Kiln Site 万富東大寺瓦窯跡 Mantomi Tōdaiji kawara gama ato	Higashi-ku, Okayama	Nara period tile kiln ruins	Mantomi Tōdaiji Tile Kiln Site	34°45′45″N 134°04′52″E	6	2252
Mitsukuri Genpo former residence 箕作阮甫旧宅 Mitsukuri Genpo kyū-taku	Tsuyama	Edo Period translator and rangaku scholar	Mitsukuri Genpo former residence	35°03′47″N 134°00′59″E	8	2294
Musa Ōtsuka Kofun 牟佐大塚古墳 Musa Ōtsuka kofun	Kita-ku, Okayama	Kofun period tumulus	Musa Ōtsuka Kofun	34°43′31″N 133°58′36″E	1	2261
Kadota Shell Mound 門田貝塚 Kadota kaizuka	Setouchi	Yayoi period shell midden	Kadota Shell Mound	34°40′00″N 134°05′40″E	1	2301
Ryōgūzan Kofun 両宮山古墳 Ryōgūzan kofun	Akaiwa	Kofun period tumulus	Ryōgūzan Kofun	34°44′23″N 134°00′10″E	1	2251
Honren-ji (Joseon Mission Sites) 朝鮮通信使遺跡 Chōsen tsushinshi iseki	Setouchi	designation includes Honren-ji (本蓮寺), Seiken-ji (清見寺) in Shizuoka, Shizuoka Prefecture, and Fukuzen-ji (福禅寺) in Fukuyama, Hiroshima Prefecture	Joseon Mission Sites - Honrenji	34°37′00″N 134°09′51″E	9	3097
Kanakurayama Kofun 金蔵山古墳; Kanakurayama kofun	Okayama			34°39′50″N 133°58′04″E		

== Prefectural Historic Sites ==
As of 1 April 2026, sixty-two Sites have been designated as being of prefectural importance.

Site	Municipality	Comments	Image	Coordinates	Type	Ref.
Natsukawa Castle ruins 撫川城跡（芝場城跡） Natsukawa-jō ato (Shibano-jō ato)	Okayama			34°38′35″N 133°50′50″E		
Bizen Province Headquarters Site 備前国庁跡; Bizen kokuchō ato	Okayama			34°41′31″N 133°57′23″E		
Jōdo-ji 浄土寺; Jōdoji	Okayama			34°41′56″N 133°57′59″E		
Kurayasu River Yoshii Sluice Gates 倉安川吉井水門; Kurayasu-gawa Yoshii suimon	Okayama			34°43′08″N 134°05′40″E		
Kaya Family Fortified Residence Site 伝賀陽氏館跡 den-Kaya-shi tate ato	Okayama			34°39′49″N 133°50′42″E		
Sakoda Kofun 坂古田古墳; Sakoda kofun	Okayama			34°41′41″N 133°49′51″E		
Ogata Kōan Birthplace 緒方洪庵誕生地; Ogata Kōan tanjō-chi	Okayama			34°43′47″N 133°48′13″E		
Kinoshita Rigen Birthplace 木下利玄生家; Kinoshita Rigen seika	Okayama			34°43′51″N 133°48′02″E		
Fujiwara no Narichika Sites 藤原成親遺跡（高麗寺山門跡と藤原成親墓地） Fujiwara no Narichika iseki (Kōraiji sanmon ato to Fujiwara no Narichika bochi)	Okayama	designation includes the sites of Kōrai-ji Sanmon and Fujiwara no Narichika's grave		34°40′16″N 133°51′14″E		
Takamatsu Castle Indundation Narutanigawa Site 高松城水攻め鳴谷川遺跡 附 工事奉行の墓; Takamatsu-jō mizuzeme Narutanigawa iseki tsuketari kōji bugyō no haka	Okayama			34°43′01″N 133°50′24″E		
Inukai Family Residence 犬養家旧宅; Inukai-ke jūtaku	Okayama			34°39′07″N 133°50′34″E		
Tokura Castle Site 徳倉城跡; Tokura-jō iseki	Okayama			34°46′31″N 133°53′45″E		
Takenouchi-ryū Kobudō Birthplace 竹内流古武道発祥の地; Takenouchi-ryū kobudō hasshō no chi	Okayama			34°55′34″N 133°53′27″E		
Matsuda Motonari and Ōmura Moritsune Grave Sites 松田元成及び大村盛恒墓所; Matsuda Motonari oyobi Ōmura Moritsune bosho	Okayama			34°45′59″N 134°03′15″E		
Ōbosan Kofun 王墓山古墳; Ōbosan kofun	Kurashiki			34°39′35″N 133°49′35″E		
Anyō-ji Urayama Sutra Mounds 安養寺裏山経塚群; Anyōji Urayama kyōzuka-gun	Kurashiki			34°38′11″N 133°45′31″E		
Shimotsui Castle ruins 下津井城跡; Shimotsui-jō iseki	Kurashiki			34°26′26″N 133°47′44″E		
Mount Shinkumano 新熊野山; Shinkumano-san	Kurashiki			34°32′25″N 133°49′11″E		
Nozaki Family Residence 野崎家旧宅; Nozaki-ke jūtaku	Kurashiki			34°28′20″N 133°48′10″E		
United Church of Christ in Japan Amaki Church and Grounds 日本キリスト教団天城教会敷地及び教会堂; Nihon Kirisutokyō-dan Amaki kyōkai shikichi oyobi kyōkaidō	Kurashiki			34°33′46″N 133°48′32″E		
Hakkō Haiji 八高廃寺; Hakkō haiji	Kurashiki			34°37′06″N 133°39′30″E		
Shōbuzako Kofun 勝負砂古墳; Shōbuzako kofun	Kurashiki			34°37′19″N 133°42′44″E		
Kuromiya Ōtsuka Tumuli 黒宮大塚墳墓群; Kuromiya Ōtsuka funbo-gun	Kurashiki			34°37′31″N 133°40′17″E		
Hikami Tennōyama Kofun - Hikami Uneyama Kofun Cluster 日上天王山古墳・日上畝山古墳群; Hikami Tennōyama kofun・Hikami Uneyama kofun-gun	Tsuyama			35°03′01″N 134°01′53″E		
Kume Haiji Site 久米廃寺跡; Kume haiji ato	Tsuyama			35°03′23″N 133°55′19″E		
Iwaya Castle ruins 岩屋城跡; Iwaya-jō ato	Tsuyama			35°04′33″N 133°50′05″E		
Yahazu Castle ruins 矢筈城跡（高山城跡）附 伝草苅景継墓所; Yahazu-jō ato (Takayama-jō ato) tsuketari den-Kusakari Kagetsugu bosho	Tsuyama	designation includes the grave site of Kusakari Kagetsugu		35°11′51″N 134°06′15″E		
Tsuyama Domain Matsudaira Clan Family Temple Taian-ji 津山藩主松平家菩提所泰安寺; Tsuyama-han-shu Matsudaira-ke bodaisho Taianji	Tsuyama			35°03′34″N 133°59′35″E		
Ōzō-ike Minami Iron Production Site 大蔵池南製鉄遺跡; Ōzō-ike Minami seitetsu iseki	Tsuyama			35°02′05″N 133°54′54″E		
Numa Site 沼遺跡; Numa iseki	Tsuyama			35°05′02″N 134°00′51″E		
Sekido Haiji Site 関戸の廃寺跡; Sekido no haiji ato	Kasaoka			34°33′28″N 133°31′46″E		
Kōjōkan 興譲館; Kōjōkan	Ibara			34°33′28″N 133°31′46″E		
Hada Haiji 秦廃寺; Hada haiji	Sōja			34°41′30″N 133°42′58″E		
Miyayama Tumuli - Miyayama Tenbō Kofun 宮山墳墓群 宮山天望古墳; Miyayama funbo-gun Miyayama Tenbō kofun	Sōja			34°41′30″N 133°42′58″E		
Hōfuku-ji 宝福寺; Hōfukuji	Sōja			34°41′30″N 133°42′58″E		
Ezaki Kofun 江崎古墳; Ezaki kofun	Sōja			34°40′07″N 133°46′37″E		
Kayadera Haiji Site 栢寺廃寺跡; Kayadera haiji ato	Sōja			34°41′10″N 133°46′40″E		
Itchōguro Kofun 一丁𡉕古墳; Itchōguro kofun	Sōja			34°41′30″N 133°42′30″E		
Junsei Dormitory Site 順正寮跡; Junsei ryō ato	Takahashi			34°47′47″N 133°37′10″E		
Takahashi Christian Church 高梁基督教会堂; Takahashi Kirisuto kyōkaidō	Takahashi			34°47′47″N 133°37′10″E		
Bitchū Matsuyama Castle Onegoya Site 備中松山城御根小屋跡; Bitchū Matsuyama-jō Onegoya ato	Takahashi			34°48′04″N 133°37′02″E		
Yamazaki Family Grave Site 山崎家墓所; Yamazaki-ke bosho	Takahashi			34°46′51″N 133°32′51″E		
Nodayama Site 野田山遺跡; Nodayama iseki	Niimi			34°55′02″N 133°27′15″E		
Hōkoku-an 方谷庵; Hōkoku-an	Niimi			35°04′02″N 133°33′44″E		
Shizutani Ware Kiln Site 閑谷焼窯跡; Shizutani-yaki kama ato	Bizen			34°46′34″N 134°13′03″E		
Mitsuishi Castle ruins 三石城跡; Mitsuishi-jō ato	Bizen			34°48′30″N 134°16′15″E		
Kabuyama Kofun 鹿歩山古墳; Kabuyama kofun	Setouchi			34°36′54″N 134°08′38″E		
Futatsukayama Kofun 二塚山古墳; Futatsukayama kofun	Setouchi			34°36′08″N 134°08′02″E		
Kekōjiyama Kofun 花光寺山古墳; Kekōjiyama kofun	Setouchi			34°42′39″N 134°06′40″E		
Tsukiyama Kofun 築山古墳; Tsukiyama kofun	Setouchi			34°40′46″N 134°08′15″E		
Minamigata Mae-ike Site 南方前池遺跡; Minamigata Mae-ike iseki	Akaiwa			34°45′03″N 134°02′13″E		
Kawahigashi Kurumazuka Kofun 川東車塚古墳; Kawahigashi Kurumazuka kofun	Maniwa			35°01′36″N 133°45′20″E		
Miyamoto Musashi Residence 伝宮本武蔵宅跡 den-Miyamoto Musashi taku ato	Mimasaka			35°05′42″N 134°19′40″E		
Doi Ichirizuka 土居一里塚; Doi ichirizuka	Mimasaka			34°59′40″N 134°15′33″E		
Tenjinyama Castle Site 天神山城跡 附 根小屋跡、岡本屋敷及び木戸館、伝浦上与次郎墓; Tenjinyama-jō ato tsuketari Negoya ato, Okamoto yashiki oyobi Kido-yakata, den-Urakami Yojirō haka	Wake	designation includes the sites of Negoya, Okamoto Residence and Kido Residence, and Urakami Yojirō's grave		34°50′58″N 134°07′34″E		
Tawara Weir Site 田原井堰跡 附 田原用水路一部、百間の石樋、切抜き; Tawara izeki ato tsuketari Tahara yōsuiro ichibu, Hyakken no ishihi, kirinuki	Wake, Akaiwa, Okayama	designation includes a section of the Tawara canal		34°49′50″N 134°07′48″E		
Kajiyadani Tatara Site 鍛冶屋谷たたら遺跡 附 供養塔; Kajiyadani tatara iseki tsuketari kuyōtō	Kagamino	designation includes a memorial tō		35°12′12″N 133°47′49″E		
Onbara Sites 恩原遺跡群; Onbara iseki-gun	Kagamino			35°18′19″N 133°59′28″E		
Hōnen Birthplace 法然上人誕生地; Hōnen shōnin tanjō-chi	Kumenan	at Tanjō-ji (誕生寺)		34°57′20″N 133°57′11″E		
Karausu Tumuli 唐臼墳墓群; Karausu funbo-gun	Misaki			35°00′06″N 133°55′01″E		
Tsukinowa Kofun 月の輪古墳; Tsukinowa kofun	Misaki			34°56′31″N 134°06′32″E		
Midoriyama Kofun Cluster 緑山古墳群; Midoriyama kofun-gun	Sōja	designation comprises three mounds (6・7・8)		34°41′30″N 133°42′30″E		

== Municipal Historic Sites ==
As of 1 May 2025, a further four hundred and seventy-one Sites have been designated as being of municipal importance.

== See also ==
- Cultural Properties of Japan
- Bitchū, Bizen and Mimasaka Provinces
- Okayama Prefectural Museum
- List of Places of Scenic Beauty of Japan (Okayama)
- List of Cultural Properties of Japan - paintings (Okayama)
- List of Cultural Properties of Japan - historical materials (Okayama)
