= Ōbosan Kofun =

Kofun period burial mound in Kurashiki, Okayama, Japan

- 王墓山古墳 (Japanese)
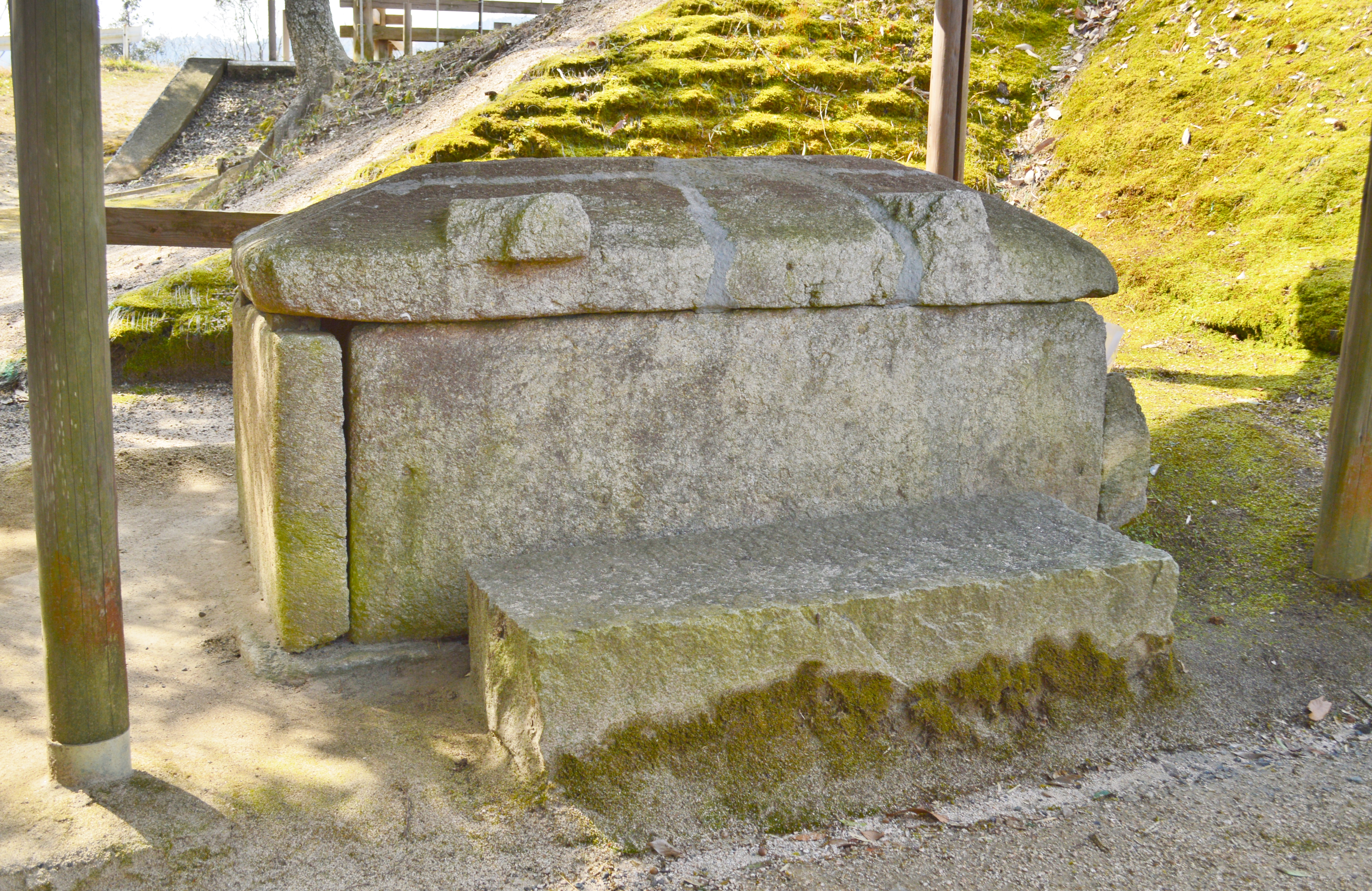
- Ōbosan Kofun stone sarcophagus

- Ōbosan Kofun Ōbosan Kofun (Japan)
- Interactive map of Ōbosan Kofun
- 34°39′35.20″N 133°49′35.34″E
- Type: Kofun
- Periods: Kofun period
- Location: Hihata, Kurashiki, Okayama, Japan
- Region: Chugoku region

History
- Built: late 6th century

Site notes
- Public access: yes
- Okayama Prefecture Historic Site

The Ōbosan Kofun (王墓山古墳), also known as the Ōhakayama Kofun or the Akai Nishi No.1 Kofun is a Kofun period burial mound, located in the Hihata neighborhood of the town of Kurashiki, Okayama Prefecture in the Chugoku region of western Japan. The tumulus was designated a Okayama Prefecture Historic Site in 1959.

== Overview ==
The Ōbosan Kofun was constructed on a low hill on the right bank of the Ashimori River in southern Okayama Prefecture. Numerous tumuli are known to be distributed throughout the hill area, and this one is the principal tumulus among them.The burial mound and stone chamber underwent significant alterations around the end of the Meiji period, and it is now uncertain whether this was originally an enpun (円墳)-style circular tumulus or a hōfun (方墳)-style square tumulus. The tumulus was approximately 25 meters in length, and has a horizontal-entry stone burial chamber. However, the mound was destroyed near the end of the Meiji period and the stones of the burial chamber and passageway have been pilfered, leaving only the composite house-shaped stone sarcophagus. This sarcophagus is made of shell limestone (known as "Namigata limestone") quarried at Ibara, Okayama and is 2.05 meters long. The construction period is estimated to be the late 6th century, during the late Kofun period.

A large number of grave goods associated with the Ōbosan Kofun are currently housed at the Tokyo National Museum. These include bronze mirrors (four Buddha and four animal mirrors with pictorial bands), gilded bronze horse trappings, iron weapons, ornaments, and Sue ware pottery; however, due to poor record keeping, there is a possibility that artifacts from surrounding tombs and unrelated archaeological sites are also mixed in..

Currently, the site with the stone sarcophagus is open to the public as the "Obo-no-Oka Historical Park". Nearby are the Tatetsuki Tumulus, one of the largest Yayoi period burial mounds in Japan, and the site of the ancient Buddhist temple, the Hihata temple ruins..

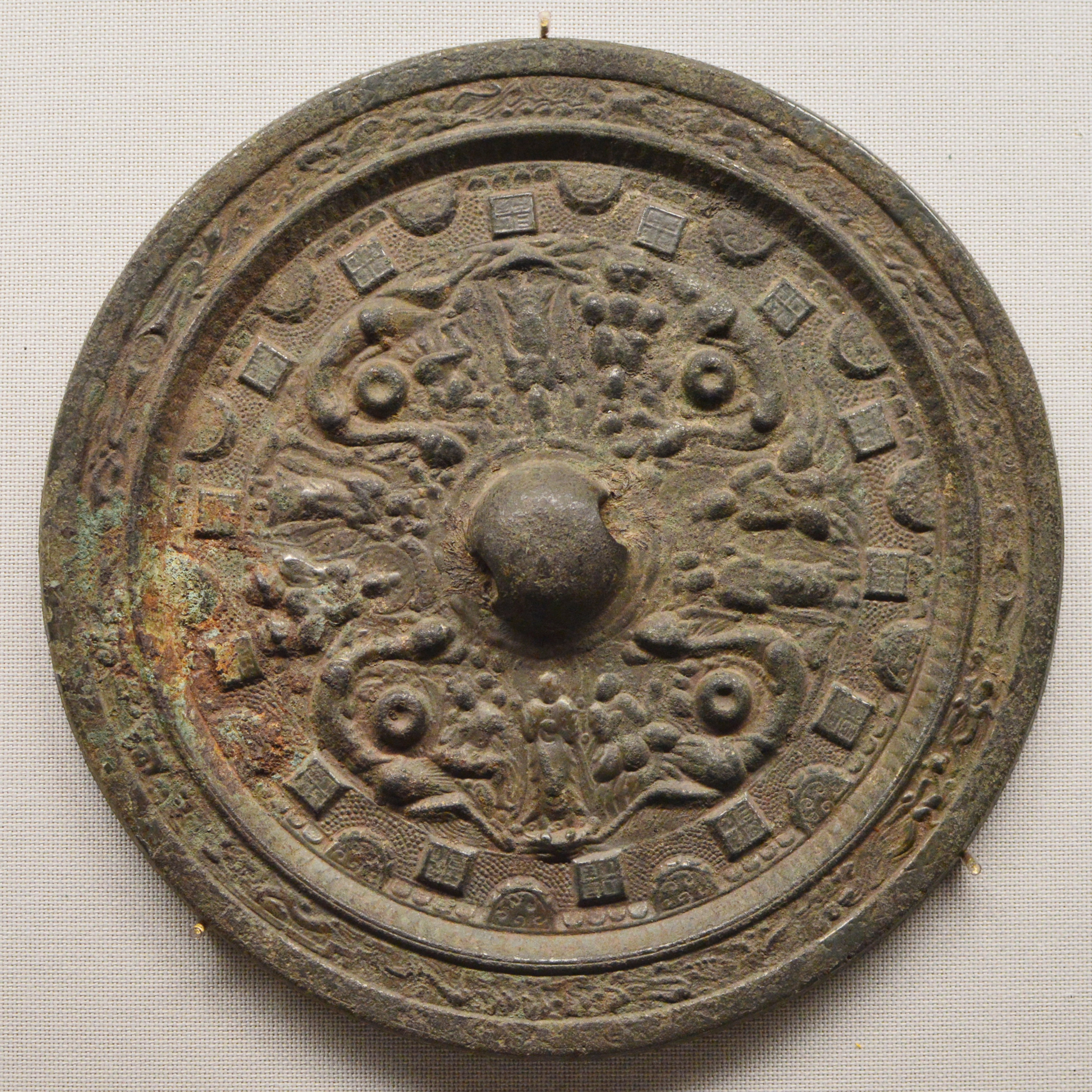
Mirror with Picture and Beast Design

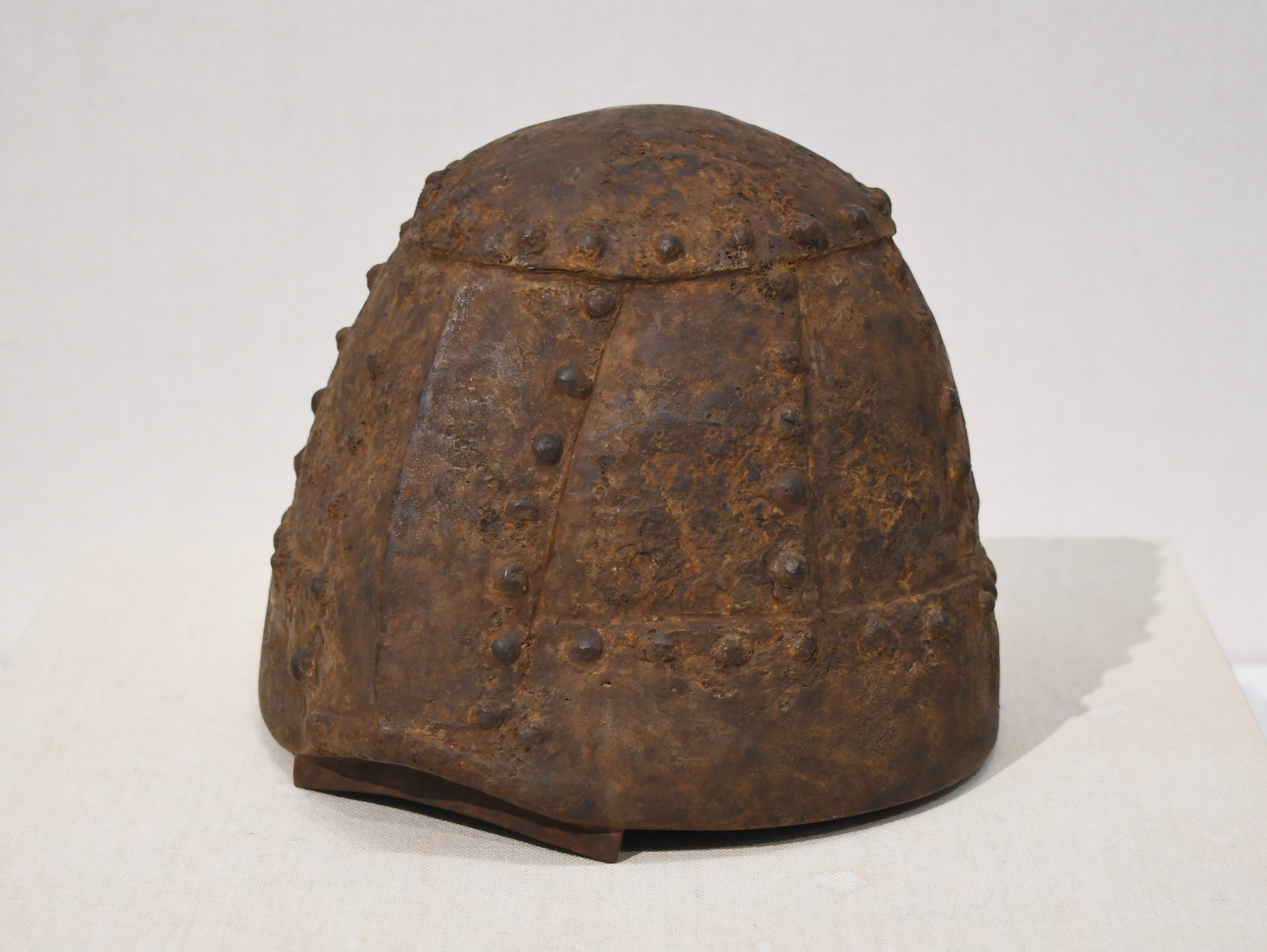
Helmet with Riveted Broad Plate and Ram

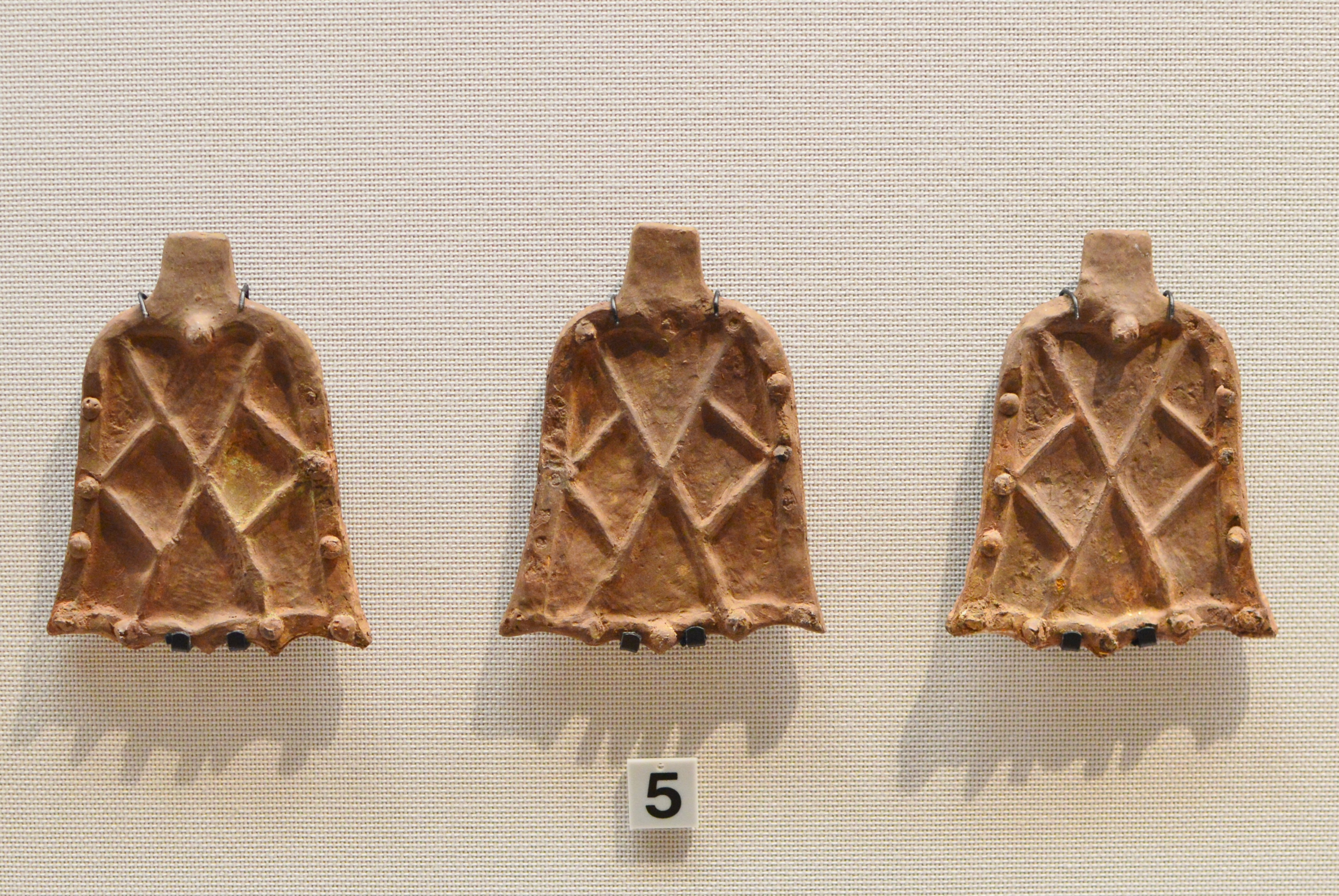
Bell-shaped Apricot Leaf

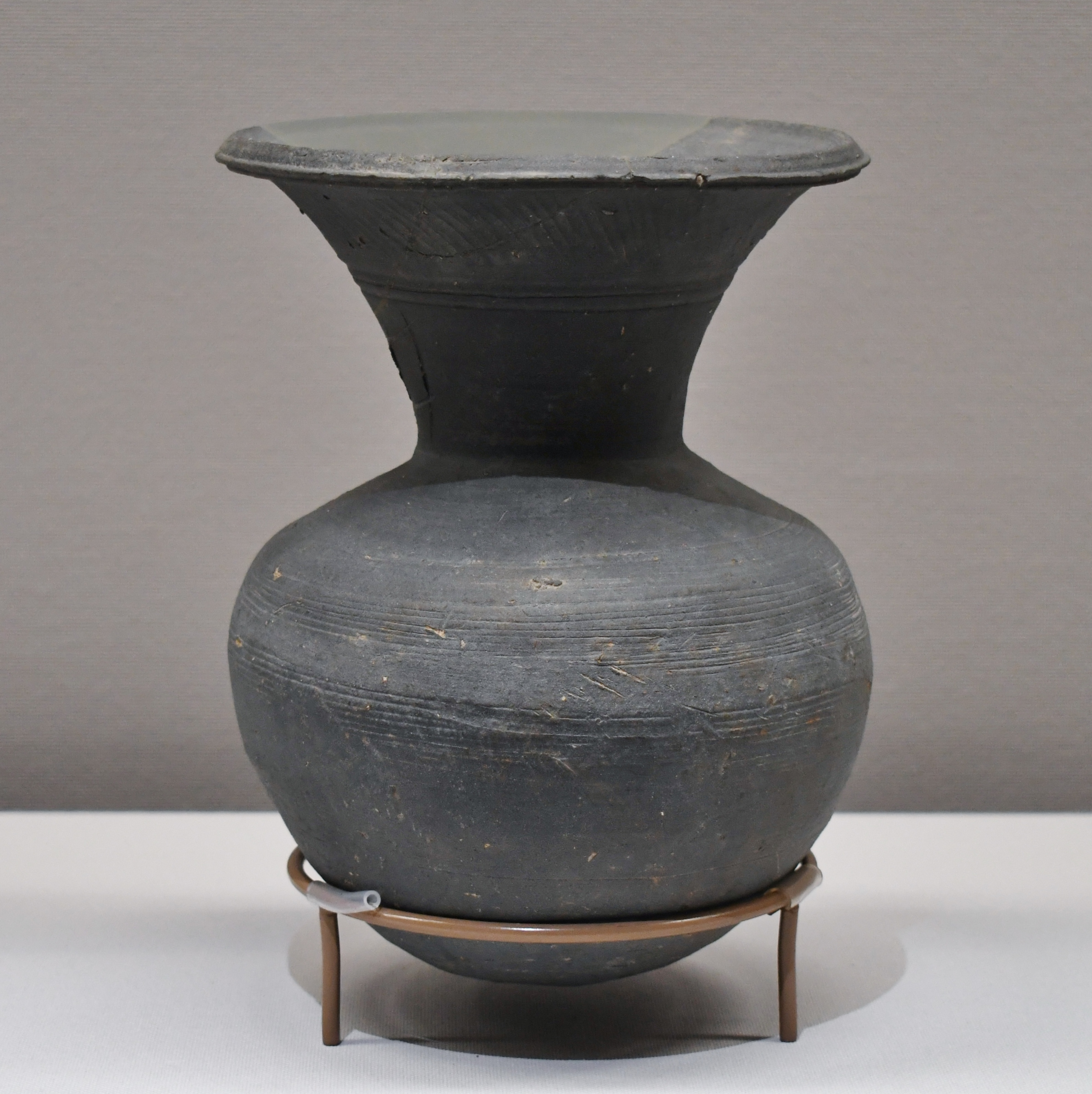
Sue ware wide-mouthed jar

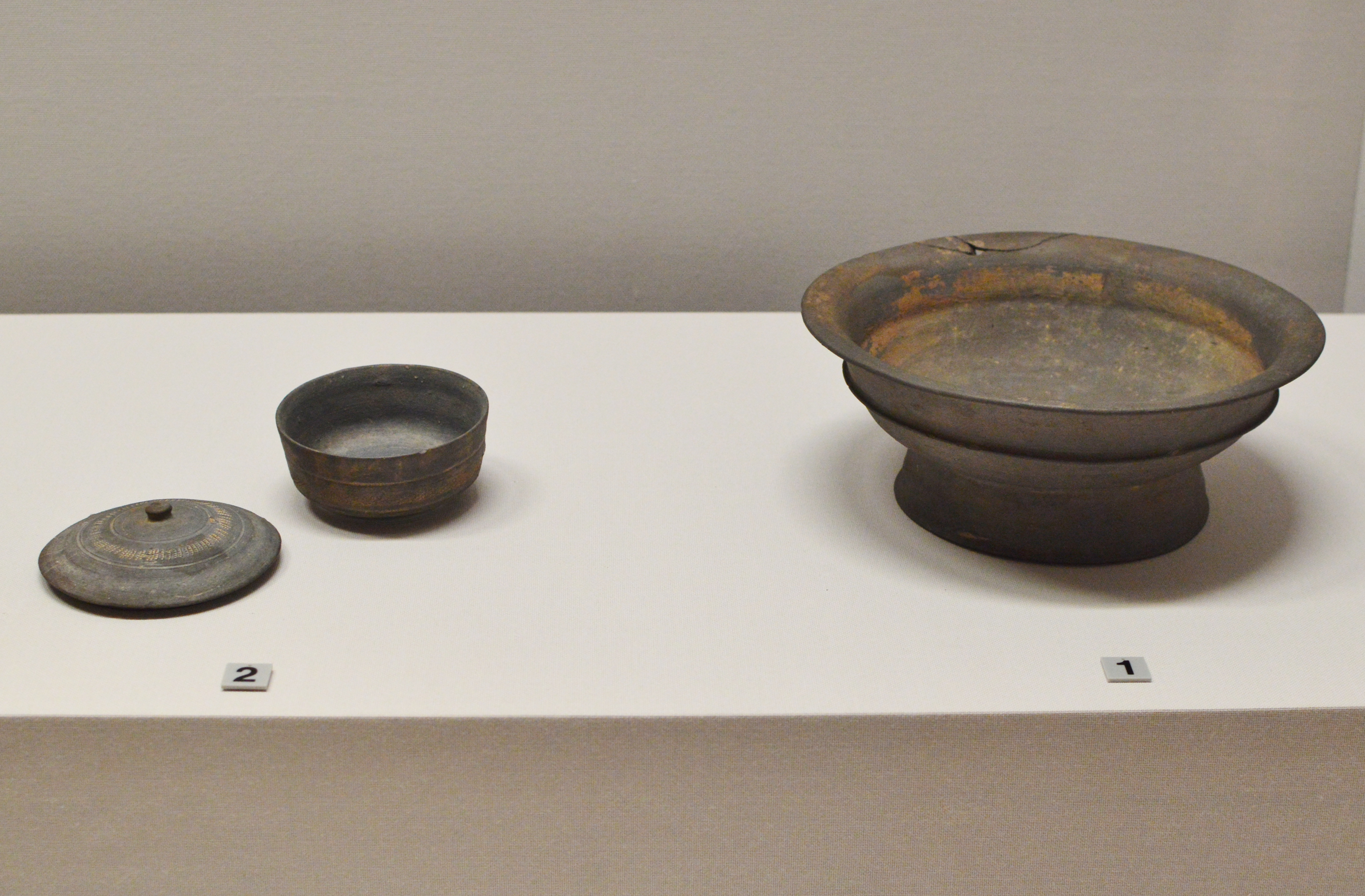
Sue ware lidded bowl and Sue ware footed bowl

The tumulus is approximately 4.7 kilometers north-northwest of Niwase Station on the JR West San'yō Main Line.

== See also ==
- List of Historic Sites of Japan (Okayama)
