= San'yō region =

Historical region of Japan

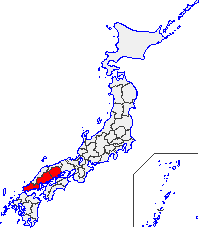
San'yō region

San'yō Region (Japanese: 山陽地方, Hepburn: San'yō-chihō) is an area in the south of Honshū, the main island of Japan. It consists of the southern part of the Chūgoku region, facing the Seto Inland Sea. The name San'yō means "southern, sunny (yō) side of the mountains" and contrasts with the San'in or "northern, shady (in) side of the mountains".

The region is generally considered to include the prefectures of Okayama, Hiroshima and Yamaguchi. Sometimes, the section of Hyōgo Prefecture that formerly comprised Harima Province is considered to be within the region as well.

San'yō encompasses the pre-Meiji provincial areas of Harima, Mimasaka, Bizen, Bitchu, Bingo, Aki, Suō and Nagato.

== Transport ==
The region is served by the San'yō Main Line and Sanyō Shinkansen.

== Demographics ==
The San'in subregion is a subregion of Chūgoku region that comprises the prefectures of Shimane, Tottori, and sometimes the northern portion of Yamaguchi Prefecture. The northern portion of Yamaguchi Prefecture comprises Abu, Hagi, and Nagato. The San'yo subregion is a subregion of Chūgoku region and is composed of the prefectures of Hiroshima, Okayama, and Yamaguchi in its entirety.

Per Japanese census data, and, the San'yo subregion has had positive population growth throughout the 20th century and negative population growth since the beginning of 21st century.

Historical population
Year	Pop.	±%
1920	3,801,000	—
1930	4,112,136	+8.2%
1940	4,492,504	+9.2%
1950	5,283,967	+17.6%
1960	5,456,043	+3.3%
1970	5,654,135	+3.6%
1980	6,197,161	+9.6%
1990	6,348,847	+2.4%
2000	6,357,707	+0.1%
2010	6,257,364	−1.6%
2020	6,079,644	−2.8%

== See also ==
- Gokishichidō
- Hokurikudō
- Nankaidō
- Saikaidō
- San'indō
- San'yōdō
- Tōkaidō
- Tōsandō

== General and cited references ==
- Nussbaum, Louis-Frédéric and Käthe Roth. (2005). Japan Encyclopedia. Cambridge: Harvard University Press. ISBN 978-0-674-01753-5; OCLC 58053128
- Titsingh, Isaac (1834). Nihon Odai Ichiran; ou, Annales des empereurs du Japon. Paris: Royal Asiatic Society, Oriental Translation Fund of Great Britain and Ireland. OCLC 5850691.
