= List of In/Spectre episodes =

List of anime episodes

First season cover art.

In/Spectre (Japanese: 虚構推理, Hepburn: Kyokō Suiri), also known as Invented Inference, is a Japanese anime television series based on the manga of the same name by Chasiba Katase, itself adapted from the novel series written by Kyo Shirodaira with illustrations also by Katase. Directed by Keiji Gotoh and produced by Brain's Base, it consists of two seasons, each twelve episodes in length.

The first season premiered from January 11 through March 28, 2020, on TV Asahi, MBS, and BS-NTV, second from January 9 through March 27, 2023, on Tokyo MX and BS-NTV.

== Series overview ==
Season	Episodes	Originally released	
Season	Episodes	First released	Last released
1	12	January 11, 2020	March 28, 2020
2	12	January 9, 2023	March 27, 2023

== Episodes ==
=== Season 1 ===
No. overall	No. in season	Title (Note: Japanese titles are official. English titles are taken from Crunchyroll, which co-produced the series and streamed it outside of Asia.)	Directed by (Note: Directors are also attributed in the credits of the episode.)	Original release date
1	1	"One Eye, One Leg"; Transliteration: "Ichigan Issoku" (Japanese: 一眼一足)	Keiji Gotoh	January 11, 2020
The 11-year-old Kotoko Iwanaga is kidnapped by Yōkai and asked to become Goddess of Wisdom. 6 years later she visits Kuro Sakuragawa, a man whose life she previously saved and fell in love with, despite his having a girlfriend, Saki Yumihara. She kept track of him for two years until the present day when Saki breaks off their engagement. Kotoko immediately asks to date him. Kuro explains Saki broke up with him after they saw a Kappa and he ran like a coward. Kotoko calls him out on the lie, suggesting it was the Kappa that ran scared from Kuro, causing Saki to realise Kuro is dangerous. Kotoko reveals most yokai are terrified of Kuro. When Kuro demands to know who she is she explains her job to settle all arguments between yokai, and she shows him that her right eye and left leg are both prosthetic, the cost of becoming a Goddess. As she leaves Ochimusa, a deceased samurai, informs her a Bull Ayakashi is infesting the library. She asks Kuro to help with the Ayakashi, to prove she is a goddess. However, the Ayakashi has gone mad and refuses to listen to her. Kuro fearlessly allows the Ayakashi to sever and eat his arm, but to Kotoko's surprise his arm completely regenerates and the Ayakashi melts and dies. Kuro explains that when he was 11 he ate two yokai.
2	2	"What the Guardian Serpent Heard"; Transliteration: "Nushi no Daija wa Kīteita" (Japanese: ヌシの大蛇は聞いていた)	Keiji Gotoh	January 18, 2020
As Kuro visits his cousin, a long term hospital patient, he tells Kotoko he ate mermaid flesh, which should have made him immortal but the second yokai he ate reduced the immortality to a powerful healing ability, though does not reveal what the second yokai was. He also reveals his flesh has become poisonous to yokai. Kotoko asks him to visit a Giant Snake mountain guardian but he refuses. Kotoko visits the snake alone; not knowing Kuro followed and is watching. The snake is confused that a woman, Tanio Aoi, dumped the body of Yoshihara Hiroo in the lake, yet the snake clearly heard her wish the body be found quickly. Kotoko reasons Tanio wanted the snake, not police, to find the body and eat it, but the snake is unsatisfied with this explanation. Kotoko explains from the police report that Tanio's boyfriend, Machii Yoshikazu, committed suicide after being caught embezzling, but two years later Yoshihara confessed he embezzled the money and murdered Machii to cover it up. Kotoko believes Tanio is actually protecting Machii's brother, who really stabbed Yoshihara, and she dumped the body as an offering to the snake, a former water god, hoping it would rain and wash away evidence. Kuro reveals himself, questioning why Kotoko keeps referring to him as her boyfriend. Confused by all the theories the snake demands to know the real reason Tanio dumped the body.
3	3	"The Rumors of the Steel Lady"; Transliteration: "Kōtetsu Fujin no Uwasa" (Japanese: 鋼鉄婦人の噂)	Shizutaka Sugahara	January 25, 2020
Kotoko finally explains Tanio was actually wishing the police would find something she hid in the swamp years before, and used the body to get police to search the right area. Tanio had been pregnant when she heard Machii committed suicide, and after miscarrying she angrily threw the fetus into the lake. After learning Machii had been framed she desperately wanted to give the fetus a real funeral. The snake accepts this explanation and as they leave Kotoko explains to Kuro that she simply gave the snake the most likely explanation. Two years later Steel Lady Nanase, the ghost of teen idol Nanase Kirin, causes a car crash. Policewoman Saki Yumihara, Kuro's ex, now suffering from depression, investigates the crash and is told that someone may be dressing as Nanase to commit crimes. She believes Nanase is real as thanks to Kuro she knows Yokai exist. On her way home she meets Kotoko, who is trying to defeat Nanase. Tired of being afraid Saki tries to defeat Nanase herself, but is unable as she is human. Kotoko's prosthetic leg comes loose just as Nanase runs away. Kotoko advises Saki to forget everything, but Saki tries to take her to the police station to get an explanation about Nanase's other attacks. Kotoko realises Saki is Kuro's ex and introduces herself as Kuro's current girlfriend, which irritates Saki.
4	4	"Idol Dies by Steel Beam"; Transliteration: "Aidoru wa Tekkotsu ni Shisu" (Japanese: アイドルは鉄骨に死す)	Tomio Yamauchi	February 1, 2020
Saki becomes convinced Kotoko is a stalker Kuro can't get rid of. Saki defends her decision to leave Kuro after Kotoko agrees that Kuro can't be classed as human. After seeing how violent Nanase was Saki is convinced she will soon commit murder. Kotoko reluctantly admits Kuro has been missing for a week, which causes a petty argument about which of them would actually be a better girlfriend for Kuro. After Kotoko leaves Saki begins investigating Nanase and finds that her father died in an accident, but evidence was later found suggesting Nanase killed him. Trying to avoid the media Nanase stopped taking on idol work and started living in several hotels. The idea that society turned against her based on rumors leads Saki to believe she may have returned as a vengeful spirit. Kotoko is suspicious as Nanase felt less like an angry spirit than a hollow puppet taking orders and realises she needs information only police can provide. Saki's research reveals Nanase was found on a construction site, face crushed by a steel beam in an accident, yet a statement taken from Karin, Nanase's older sister, worries Saki. Saki is visited by a tree spirit sent by Kotoko to ask for information about Nanase's death, with the implication she will keep sending yokai to bug her until she agrees. Meanwhile, Kotoko heads to the latest sighting of Nanase and finds her in a violent fight with Kuro.
5	5	"A Monster of the Imagination"; Transliteration: "Sōzōryoku no Kaibutsu" (Japanese: 想像力の怪物)	Risako Yoshida	February 8, 2020
Kotoko watches Kuro before Saki arrives in time to see Nanase crush Kuro's head, only for it to regrow. Saki is concerned that Kuro still seems unconcerned. Kuro approaches Nanase, dodges her attack and restrains her. Saki is confused as his dodge looked perfectly timed. Kotoko reveals the second yokai Kuro ate was a Kudan, allowing him to predict future events. 10 generations ago the head of Kuro's family forced his relatives to eat Kudan to gain prophetic powers and Mermaid flesh so they would not die after seeing the future, but even more people died and the experiments were abandoned. Kuro's grandmother repeated the experiment on him and was successful, but Kuro became inhuman and Saki watches as Kuro breaks Nanase's neck, which only scares her more. Nanase recovers so Kotoko stops the fight and Nanase disappears. While talking to Saki, Kuro is happy to see her and admits Kotoko is his current girlfriend. Kotoko reveals that to a Yokai Kuro has the monstrous mixed appearance of a human, Mermaid, and Kudan, which makes Nanase's not fearing him even stranger. Kotoko believes Nanase was created by the imaginations of millions of people, fuelled by a website dedicated to Nanase, giving her the energy needed to manifest as a powerful physical spirit.
6	6	"Logical Fiction"; Transliteration: "Gōri Tekina Kyokō" (Japanese: 合理的な虚構)	Shizutaka Sugahara	February 15, 2020
Since Nanase was created by people's imaginations, they must use the website to defeat imagination. Saki suggests shutting down the site, but that would be too legally complicated. Kotoko suggests creating another explanation for Nanase to draw people's attention onto the new story, causing her to disappear. Saki unwillingly provides more details about Nanase. Police deemed it likely she committed suicide but eventually called it an accident. Nanase's sister, Hatsumi, always refused to believe Nanase was suicidal yet still blamed Nanase for their father's death, but had an alibi. At the crime scene Kotoko summons the spirit of a deceased construction worker, terrifying Saki. The worker reveals the beams fell by accident, but Nanase did nothing to save herself, essentially committing suicide. Saki disagrees with Kotoko's methods as it doesn't let police know the truth and any alternate story is unlikely to be believed. Kotoko decides to use Kuro's future predictions to find the right story and Kuro agrees, despite it requiring him to die and resurrect. In the past Kuro had explained that Kudans don't predict the future, they select a future from limitless possibilities and make it come true, the effort of which kills them. Kuro must let Nanase kill him again and while dead must manage to select a future in which they defeat her. Sergeant Terada Tokunoske, one of Saki's coworkers, confronts Nanase believing her to be a criminal in a costume, and is murdered.
7	7	"Preparing to Conquer the Steel Lady"; Transliteration: "Haganejin Kōryakusen Junbi" (Japanese: 鋼人攻略戦準備)	Tomio Yamauchi	February 22, 2020
Saki is forced to lie about her whereabouts during Terada's murder, while the media link his death to Nanase, fuelling the rumours. Saki decides to help Kotoko to avenge Terada. Kotoko warns Kuro that his hospitalised cousin, Rikka, is undoubtedly involved, and Kuro admits he cannot defend her anymore now Nanase has committed murder. Saki arrives and is told that due to another new rumour spreading online Nanase will likely begin chasing victims rather than let them escape, and it will be even more difficult for Kuro to choose an acceptable future. In order to come up with a better story Kotoko demands the truth from Saki at all times. They struggle to come up with a fake culprit for Nanase's attacks and Terada's murder that are believable enough, until Kuro suggests spreading multiple rumours online and allowing internet users to create the fake culprit for them, while he can keep Nanase busy by letting her keep killing him and choosing new futures. With a plan in place Kotoko passes out from lack of sleep while Kuro waits with Saki for Nanase to appear in the city. Saki decides to go with him, determined to get past her fear of yokai. While discussing his relationship with Kotoko, Saki mentions Rikka, who she thought would be more Kuro's type, recalling that she was beautiful and physically weak with very pale skin.
8	8	"She Who Spins Fiction"; Transliteration: "Kyokō wo Tsumugu Mono" (Japanese: 虚構を紡ぐ者)	Shizutaka Sugahara	February 29, 2020
Saki remembers Rikka having an unnatural aura, and overheard nurse's mention that Rikka tried to kill herself multiple times. Kuro reveals Rikka is not dead, as she was also forced to consume yokai flesh and is unable to die. Kotoko wakes up from her nap and worries something drastic happened between Kuro and Saki as they are acting awkward. After expressing curiosity Kotoko tells Saki Rikka entered the hospital to have her abilities medically analysed, but had been living at Kotoko's mansion since being suddenly discharged and unsuccessfully trying to move in with Kuro. Kotoko claims they got on well with Rikka, until she moved out of the mansion and disappeared a month previously, then Kuro disappeared two weeks later until Kotoko and Saki found him fighting Nanase. Saki deduces Rikka somehow created Nanase and Kuro has been trying to stop her, and Kotoko reveals the online image of Nanase was actually one of Rikka's paintings. Kotoko suspects Rikka has been experimenting to see how powerful her ability to choose futures can be. Nanase appears in the city while elsewhere Rikka kills herself to choose another future. Kuro begins to fight Nanase while Kotoko begins spreading rumours online, hoping to cause enough doubt in the online community that Nanase will be rendered powerless. Rikka resurrects and watches events unfold online.
9	9	"The Committee to Conquer Steel Lady Nanase"; Transliteration: "Haganejin Nanase Kōryaku Gikai" (Japanese: 鋼人七瀬攻略議会)	Tomio Yamauchi	March 7, 2020
Kotoko spreads the rumour a murderer planned to kill Detective Terada all along and made the Nanase urban legend more popular before the murder to confuse the police. Even dressing as Nanase to attack people and make the legend more believable, so that when Terada died, Nanase would be blamed, instead of the actual killer. As Kuro continues to fight Kotoko begins arguing with internet users online, spreading her fake story, providing reasonable answers to all their questions. In the end she puts all her theories together and begins a rumour the killer was a female police officer who worked with Terada at the same police station. Saki angrily notices the rumour basically describes her, and Kotoko admits she did base the rumour on Saki so as to potentially spare other innocent suspects. The internet users suddenly begin arguing again and Saki and Kotoko realise Rikka must be forcing other futures to come true as well as posting online herself. Kuro is killed twice more and finds that certain futures have now been cut off due to Rikka's interference. He resurrects and manages to disarm Nanase of her weapon, proving she is slowly growing weaker. Kotoko reveals she has multiple rumours prepared and begins spreading her second rumour.
10	10	"Dueling Fictions"; Transliteration: "Kyokō Sōdatsu" (Japanese: 虚構争奪)	Shizutaka Sugahara	March 14, 2020
Kotoko spreads the idea that Nanase actually is a ghost who regretted being accused of murdering her father, and is trying to convince people of her innocence. Kotoko reveals Nanase's father left a note saying he suspected Nanase wanted to kill him, and guesses he was jealous of her success, so he killed himself in a way Nanase would be blamed. Kotoko then claims Nanase met her father in heaven and he told her why he did it, causing her to become a vengeful spirit. She implores everyone online to send Nanase prayers so she can move on. Kuro dies again and manages to grasp a weak strand of a possible future. The prayers weaken Nanase considerably but Rikka regains partial control and people start to question Nanase's behaviour. Rikka kills herself again while Kotoko prepares her third rumour, Nanase is alive. As her sister Hatsumi frequently claimed Nanase would never kill herself, she wonders if Nanase is actually dead at all and whether the body was somebody else, with the face smashed to hide her identity. If it was Hatsumi who spread the rumour Nanase killed their father, she must have wondered if Nanase faked her death as revenge against her. It is therefore possible someone began faking Nanase's ghost to convince Hatsumi Nanase is actually dead, most likely a stalker who killed Terada after being caught in his Nanase costume. This backfires when Rikka points out faking Nanase's ghost is more likely to scare Hatsumi even more, causing Kuro to lose the future he was trying to grasp.
11	11	"The Ultimate Fiction"; Transliteration: "Saigo no Kyokō" (Japanese: 最後の虚構)	Haruto Ogawa	March 21, 2020
With the third rumour disproved Rikka moves on to other futures, so Kotoko springs her trap and returns to the idea Nanase's sister leaked the rumour Nanase killed their father. Saki realises Kotoko had expertly manipulated Rikka into selecting futures she wanted, and a future Kuro thought had disappeared suddenly becomes available again. Kotoko claims Nanase is still alive and faked her death by substituting the corpse of a girl she murdered and smashed her face to hide her identity, then assumed the girls identity in order to begin a new life and meanwhile created the story of Steel Lady Nanase to convince people she had really died. This new rumour throws the internet into chaos as theories fly back and forth, this time about how Nanase is definitely not real. Rikka loses her grip of a possible future as Nanase weakens considerably. Kotoko finishes her plan by claiming Nanase herself created the Nanase website, and murdered Terada. She then challenges the websites creator, Rikka, to somehow prove she is not Nanase. Unable to do so Rikka completely loses control of the future, Kotoko declares her victory as the internet decides Nanase is alive and not a ghost. Kuro selects a final future and strikes a final blow on Nanase by smashing her face with her own steel beam.
12	12	"She Who Defends Order"; Transliteration: "Chitsujo wo Mamoru Kanojo" (Japanese: 秩序を守る彼女)	Keiji Gotoh	March 28, 2020
Rikka emails Kotoko, congratulating her on her win but promising to come back. Kotoko fears Rikka might try again, reasoning that due to the limitless potential of human imagination it may be possible to create anything, even a new God. The next day, Saki learns that Nanase's website has been shut down and internet users are they refocus on the rumor that Nanase is still alive. Kuro takes Saki to dinner, as Kotoko is still sleeping suffering from a mental breakdown. She explains that Rikka is desperate to be human again and has been looking for a medical solution in the hospital, but now she is attempting to use her power to create a creature capable of turning her into a human. He fears it's impossible because Rikka has always been a bit monstrous herself before eating yokai meat, but he isn't worried as Kotoko considers it her duty to stop her. Kuro admits he's worried that Kotoko will keep putting herself in danger, which is why he's been trying to face Nanase without her. But now Rikka knows that Kotoko will try to stop her, it's possible that Rikka will try to kill her. Saki returns home, happy that someone is keeping the yokai world in order though she doubts that she will ever see Kuro again. Kotoko wakes up irritated for leaving Kuro alone with Saki for a day and a half. Eventually they decide to keep an eye on Rikka, but plan to spend time with Kotoko's parents before her while Kotoko continues in her role as the Goddess of Wisdom.

=== Season 2 ===
No. overall	No. in season	Title	Directed by	Original release date
13	1	"That God's Name Is"; Transliteration: "Sono Kami no Na Wa" (Japanese: その神の名は)	Keiji Gotoh	January 9, 2023
14	2	"The Yuki-Onna's Dilemma"; Transliteration: "Yuki-onna no Jirenma" (Japanese: 雪女のジレンマ)	Haruto Ogawa	January 16, 2023
15	3	"The Yuki-Onna's Alibi"; Transliteration: "Yuki-onna no Aribai" (Japanese: 雪女のアリバイ)	Haruka Kamohara	January 23, 2023
16	4	"The Yuki-Onna's Innocence"; Transliteration: "Yuki-Onna no Junshin" (Japanese: 雪女の純真)	Haruto Ogawa	January 30, 2023
17	5	"Rikka Returns"; Transliteration: "Rikka Futatabi" (Japanese: 六花ふたたび)	Haruka Kamohara	February 6, 2023
18	6	"Electroshock Pinocchio"; Transliteration: "Dengeki no Pinokkio" (Japanese: 電撃のピノッキオ)	Haruto Ogawa	February 13, 2023
19	7	"Or You Could Wish Upon a Star"; Transliteration: "Aruiha Hoshi ni Negai wo" (Japanese: あるいは星に願いを)	Haruka Kamohara	February 20, 2023
20	8	"And So, the Ruler Disappeared"; Transliteration: "Soshite Shihaisha wa Inaku Natta" (Japanese: そして支配者はいなくなった)	Haruto Ogawa	February 27, 2023
21	9	"The Silenced Children"; Transliteration: "Monoienu Kodomotachi" (Japanese: もの言えぬ子ども達)	Kanata Kitae	March 6, 2023
22	10	"Uninvited Judge"; Transliteration: "Manekarezaru Hanteiyaku" (Japanese: 招かれざる判定役)	Haruto Ogawa	March 13, 2023
23	11	"Sleeping Murder"; Transliteration: "Surīpingu・Mādā" (Japanese: スリーピング・マーダー)	Kanata Kitae	March 20, 2023
24	12	"A Lucky Day at the Unagi Restaurant"; Transliteration: "Unagi-ya no Koūnbi" (Japanese: うなぎ屋の幸運日)	Keiji Gotoh	March 27, 2023
