= Kudan =

Kudan may refer to:

- Kudan, Rajasthan, in India
- Kudan, Nigeria, a Local Government Area in Kaduna State
- Kudan, 9th degree black belt, see Dan (rank)
- The Kudan (九段), a residence in Tokyo, Japan, since 1944 the official residence of the Philippine Ambassador to Japan
- Kudan (yōkai), a Japanese spirit
