= Kiichi Harada =

Japanese Dressage Rider

Personal information
- Full name: 原田 喜市 (はらだ きいち)
- Nationality: Japan
- Born: 30 November 1972 (age 53) Yamagata Prefecture

Sport
- Sport: Dressage
- Club: Hiruzen Horse Park
- Coached by: Christoph Koschel

Kiichi Harada is a Japanese Olympic Dressage rider. Representing Japan, he competed at the 2016 Summer Olympics in Rio de Janeiro where he finished 45th in the individual and 11th in the team competition.

Kiichi was born into the horse riding world, the oldest son of the owner of the Nishizao Horse Riding Club in Yamagata Prefecture. He started riding at age 6, motivated by the receipt of a pony as a birthday present. At age 17 he began training under Masayasu Sugitani, owner of the Sugitani Riding Club in Izumi City, Osaka. In 2000 he moved to Okayama in preparation for the 2005 National Sports Festival of Japan in Okayama, where he won both the Eventing and Dressage categories. Immediately after the successful competition he moved to Hiruzen, Okayama Prefecture, where in 2007 he became the President of the Maniwa City Hiruzen Kougen Riding Park, more commonly known as Hiruzen Horse Park. From 2005 to 2016 Kiichi had 143 tournament wins recognized by the Japan Equestrian Federation. In 2014 he started focusing solely on Dressage. His score in the individual Dressage competition at the 2016 Summer Olympics has thus far been the highest score ever attained by a Japanese rider at the Olympic Games.

== Competition ==
Date	Show	Competition	Position	Horse
12/12/2021	Japan National Dressage Championships - Tokyo	Grand Prix and GP Special	1	FAIRYTALE S
28/02/2020	Global Dressage Festival in Wellington, Florida	CDI3* Grand Prix Freestyle to Music	1	FAIRYTALE S
27/02/2020	Global Dressage Festival in Wellington, Florida	CDI4* Grand Prix	1	EGISTAR
21/02/2020	Global Dressage Festival in Wellington, Florida	CDI3* Grand Prix Freestyle to Music	1	EGISTAR
20/02/2020	Global Dressage Festival in Wellington, Florida	CDI3* Grand Prix	1	EGISTAR
08/11/2015	Miki	CDI3* Grand Prix Special	1	EGISTAR
07/11/2015	Miki	CDI3* Grand Prix	1	EGISTAR
11/10/2003	Miki-Hyogo - not FEI approved	CIC1*	1	REILY

== Old Friends Japan ==
In April 2021 Kiichi spearheaded the foundation of Old Friends Japan, a retraining and retirement facility for off-track Thoroughbred racehorses in Hiruzen, Okayama. Old Friends Japan got its name from Old Friends Equine, an equine aftercare and retirement facility run by Mr. Michael Blowen in Georgetown, Kentucky.
