= Kudan (yōkai) =

Japanese spirit

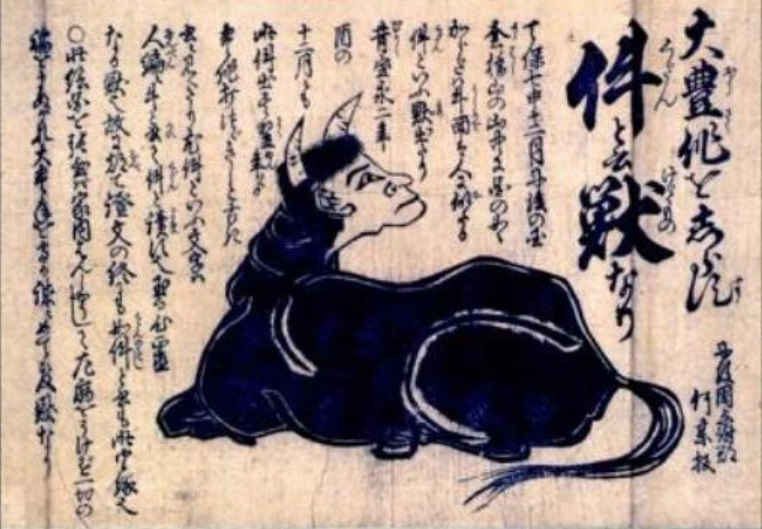
The kudan of "Mount Kurahashi", Tango Province. A kawaraban dated Tenpō 7 (1836). — woodblock-printed (on wood), in the collection of the Tokugawa Institute for the History of Forestry.

The kudan (件; literally "matter"; (Note: The character 件 can be read ken" and means "matter, topic, subject". The phrase "kudan no~" is a qualifier meaning "XXX which is the topic/matter we are concerned with".) or "human-faced bovine"). (Note: The 件 iscomposed of the "human" radical and "cattle" radical. See § Etymology below.) is a yōkai of a "prophecy beast" type, whose news or urban legend has been disseminated in Japan since the Edo Period.

The human-faced, bovine-bodied kudan that allegedly appeared in "Mount Kurahashi", Tango Province (in today's Kyoto Prefecture) in the year Tenpō 7 (1836) was reported in a contemporary kawaraban. (Note: A single sheet woodblock-print newspaper, sometimes glossed as a "broadside".)) It predicted bountiful harvest in the ensuing years, and instructed people to paste up the picture image of itself for the home to ward off evil and prosper. The kawaraban's claim that the stock phrase "kudan no gotoshi" ("as in the case/matter in question") which frequently appeared at the end of certificates/deeds, was actually a reference to this monster is considered spurious.

The variant kutabe (or kudabe, kutahe) allegedly appeared in Mount Tate, Etchū Province (Toyama Prefecture), datable to Bunsei 10 (1827).

== Etymology ==
The kanji for kudan consists of two characters, the ninben/hito (亻/人; 'person' radical), and ushi (牛; 'cow' or 'bull'), aptly representing its human-bovine composite nature (i.e., human-headed and bovine-bodied). (Note: The reverse, a bovine-headed and human-bodied example of a kudan is known. One allegedly appeared in the late 19th century (25 or 6 years before Minakata's essay of 1921, hence 1894 or 1895). The anecdote was collected from an informant named Sugawa, Kantoku (須川寛得), who was resident of Miwasakicho (former town, now part of Shingū, Wakayama).)

This breakdown of the kanji ideogram is even stated on the woodblock print leaflet example. and also discussed by novelist Hyakken Uchida in his story "Kudan".

== Phraseology ==
Throughout Japan, the idiom "like the kudan" (件の如し, kudan no gotoshi) began to appear on deeds and official documents. The phrase simply means 'As in the case [at hand]', though a meaning "on the truth of the Kudan", invoking the monster has also been alleged. However while the kudan monster dates to the late Edo Period, the idiom is much older, dating to the Heian period, (Note: It appears on page 128 of the early 11th century book The Pillow Book.) so the relationship between the phrase and the monster has been refuted as an anachronism.

== General description ==
=== Iconography ===
The kudan is generally depicted as having the head of a human and the body of a bovine. The kudan is recorded as being "human-faced, cattle-bodied" (人面牛身) in an early attestation from a samurai scribe's diary (Bunsei 2, year 1819) (Note: Mikkyoku nichijō (『密局日乗』), the Chōshū Domain)

The news of the "kudan" has been disseminated in illustrated newspapers called the kawaraban (single sheeted wood-block print, hence sometimes referred to as a type of "broadsides"), and several examples have survived. (Note: "Kudan" (Tenpo7/1836, surimono print); "Kudan-jū.. etc." (Keiō 3/1867, nishiki-e or multicolor print))

The well-publicized Tenpō Era (1836) notice of the kudan refers to the "beast named kudan" in its title, and explains that the beast had "a body [like unto] cattle, and a face like a human", (Note: Japanese:"からだハ牛（うし）、面（かを）は人に似（に）たる".) and This piece is part of the collection at the Tokugawa Institute for the History of Forestry (Tokugawa rinseishi kenkyūjo ). This kawaraban (single-sheet woodblock-print newspaper, a broadside) is actually visibly printed on a piece of wood. (Note: The wood grain texture is detectable in the color photo of the "kawaraban" in the "yōkai mummy FILE" book by Naoki Yamaguchi (2020), but more clearly visible in the larger photo of the "kawaraban" that spans across opposite pages in "yōkai FILE" book by Miyamoto (2013), both published by educational publishing house Gakken.) (Note: The artefact is noted by several researchers on the subject who do not call it a "kawaraban", and it bears the imprint 丹後国与謝郡何某板 (Tango no kuni Yosa [no] koori nanigashi ban; , "Wooden board of anonymous [in] Yosa-no-kōri, Tango Province"), Yosa-no-kōri later became Yosa-gun in the Meiji Era (Yosa District, Kyoto), but the greater part of the gun later became Miyazu City.)

This printed wood plate states that the kudan appeared "in the 12th month of Tenpō 7, the year of the monkey [1836], on "Mount Kurahashi" (倉橋山), or perhaps rather "in the mountains at the foot of Kurahashi [village]". The Mt. Kurahashi (倉梯山), 91 metres (299 ft) altitude, in Miyazu, west of the Amanohashidate scenic monument fits the location. (Note: 35°33′17″N 135°08′54″E. There is also the same-named "Mount Kurahashi" (倉梯山) in Maizuru City, in the Tango region of Kyoto, and an abolished Kurahashi village that is now part of Maizuru, but these locations are off.)

There have also survived hand-copied documents which replicated kudan's picture and text from a kawaraban. One such copy occurs in the Shika zakki [?] (「止可雑記」) in the Mōri family library collection, held by the Yamaguchi Prefectural Archives. (Note: "Daihōsaku wo shirasu kudan to iu kemono nari (大豊作を志ら寿件と云獣なり"), 12th month of Tenpo 7. Mōri-ke bunko 29, fūsetsu 43 Shika zakki [?] (毛利家文庫29 風説 42 「止可雑記」).). Another hand-copied example on paper manuscript has belonged to the family based in Gorobeishinden village (now part of Saku, Nagano). (Note: Also titled "Daihōsaku wo shirasu kudan to iu kemono nari (大豊作を知ら寿件と云獣なり"), 12th month of Tenpo 7. Listed in the catalog: Gorbeishinden komonjo mokuroku dai-5 shu. Dai-5-bu: Tsuchiya Yoshihiko-ke komonojo mokuroku dai-t-shū (『五郎兵衛新田古文書目録』第5集 「第6部 土屋芳彦家古文書目録」), p. 85, No. 101)

The news of the monster called by the variant names of kutabe, kudabe, etc. (cf. § Kutabe below) were disseminated in Bunsei 10–12 (1827–1829), and it was claimed that its human encounter occurred on Mount Tate, in present-day Toyama Prefecture. (Note: Hosoki used "kutabe" as standard, with variants kutahe, kudabe (クタヘ、クダベ); whereas Nagano refers to these variants as the "kudabe group" (クダベ系) Hosoki, p. 87 states: "the kudan and hakutaku (bai ze) regarded as equivalent to [kutabe] .. 同一視される「件」と「白澤」..".) (Note: Hosoki's paper regards 4 out of 7 "kutabe" group primary documents as datable to Bunsei 10 or 11 (1827 or 1828), and regards her number 7 (Dōchō tosetsu)as "no date" which Nagano assigns to Spring of Bunsei 12 (1829).) Many of the kutabe/kudabe illustrations bear long-haired woman-like faces according to scholars, but may also have a head like a bald old man (Note: Hosoki's No. 1. Or have a "fatigued medical monk's body" (Hosoki's No. 4)) and may not manifest bovine features, and have sharp claws. While some pictures have eyes on their bodies, like the luck beast Bai ze (Hakutaku).

Tales of cow-headed women or ushi-onna also became urban legend from around the time of World War II.

=== Prophesy beast ===
The kudan is typical of the so-called prophesy beasts (予言獣, yongenjū) of Japanese folklore, (Note: Others being amabie, amabiko、jinjahime, etc.) which not only portend plague or bounty, but prescribe the method on how to avoid being stricken. Typically the prophecy beast instructs people to view a picture image of itself, or to copy it to ward off evil luck, and the kutabe/kudabe group of variant follow that norm.

The kudan pictorial on the kawaraban flyers, was not merely a pictorial and written information sheet being circulated, and it was understood that the flyer itself could be used as a gofu (護符), a type of amulet typically printed or hand-copied on paper. The aforementioned artefact dated Tenpo7/1836 (referred to as a kawaraban example), which is entitled "A beast called kudan which lets known great bountiful harvests", and goes onto say "If one paste up this picture image, the home inside shall flourish and not receive calamity&disease, all misfortune whatsoever shall be averted, and a great bumper-crop harvest shall ensue; it is a truly propitious beast". At this time, the Tenpō famine was at its peak, and so it is believed that this report was intended to "give people hope of a good harvest".

This same artefact also claims that a past appearance of the kudan, in the 12th month of Hōei 2/1705, recorded in an ancient document. (Note: It also mentions the idiom (cf. § Phraseology below): "Because the kudan is an honest beast, it is customary to write "like the Kudan" at the end of every act and deed".)

The kutabe variants only portent evil (epidemic), and are not known to predict blessings of bountiful harvest, unlike most prophesy beasts. (Note: Whereas the standard kudan (Tenpo 7 example) does preict good harvest.)

In a late example, the kudan was rumoured to have predicted Japan's defeat during World War II. There were also rumours among Japanese immigrant population in Brazil about a kudango (件子) predicting that Japan would emerge victorious.

=== Born as calf ===
An early attestation of kudan occurs in the aforementioned Mikkyoku nichijō (『密局日乗』) dated to Bunsei 2 (1819), where a human language-speaking and human-headed calf declared it should be given the name "kudan".

A document reporting the birth of a kudan from a cow, dated 12th of the 3rd month of Ansei 7 (1860) was discovered 2020 at the Hyogo Prefectural Museum of History.

The multicolor woodblock-print (nishiki-e) entitled Kudanjū no shashin (件獣之写真) dated to the very end of the Edo Period (Keiō 3/1867), also reports that a kudan born from a cow, after speaking out its prophecy, dies as a 3-day old newborn. (Note: Exact title in period kanji and kana: 件獸之寫真（くだんじうのしゃしん）, dated Keiō 3/1867 by Kendō Ishii This primary source is listed as Sato 1993, pp. 81–83, Fig. 1; Nagano 2005, Table, Item 13. A color image of this old print is shown (with the words quite legible) in the online extra edition of KWAI & yoo 『怪と幽』; the piece is authored by Masanobu Kagawa (香川雅信), curator at the Hyogo Prefectural Museum of History.) although later write more approximately. (Note: 2,3 days according to a dictionary of Okayama folklore (1975), 4, 5 days according to Kunio Yanagita.)

After the shogunate ended and the Meiji era began, the kudan was still mentioned in writings and Lafcadio Hearn heard about travelling showmen displaying an alleged stuffed specimen of a kudan.

In the Taisho era, novelist Hyakken Uchida published a short novel entitled Kudan (1921), where it is stated "the kudan dies 3 days after birth, and in the meanwhile, in the language of humans, it prognosticates the ill or good luck of the future (Note: This work is thought to have been read by Mimei Ogawa who wrote Ushi-onna and Sakyo Komatsu who wrote Kudan no haha. See infra.)

Dating to the Shōwa era, the kudan is listed in a dictionary of the folklore of Okayama Prefecture, as well as in the writings of Kunio Yanagita who originates from the adjacent Hyogo Prefecture. The kudan is described as a strange beast born from a cow, or allegedly born as a cross between cattle and human, (Note: Miyatake Gaikotsu (1931) comments that the genesis of a human-faced kudan is only possible if conceived of by human as either parent.) capable of human speech, and dies within a few days of birth. (Note: In 4, 5 days or 2, 3 days) Meanwhiled, it prophesizes the advent of various grave occurrences, such as crop failure, epidemic, drought, or war. which reputedly come to pass without fail. Instances of kudan given birth by cattle in the Kansai region have been reported in the postwar period.

Calves born with certain illness deformities can give the impression of human-like face features, (Note: Akabane disease (caused by the Akabane virus) is mentioned by yōkai writer and collector Hirokatsu Kihara.) which could explain reports of kudan birth in some cases, according to some writers.

== Kutabe ==
"Kutabe" written in kanji characters.

The kutabe allegedly was spotted in Mount Tate, Toyama (Hirokata zuihitsu).

The kutabe or kudabe is considered an equivalent (subclass) of the kudan, though kutabe's legend is set specifically in Tateyama in Etchū Province (Mount Tate, in today's Toyama Prefecture). (Note: Hosoki used "kutabe" as standard, with variants kutahe, kudabe (クタヘ、クダベ); whereas Nagano refers to these variants as the "kudabe group" (クダベ系) Hosoki, p. 87 states: "the kudan and hakutaku (bai ze) regarded as equivalent to [kutabe] .. 同一視される「件」と「白澤」..".) The news of the kutabe or kudabe were circulated in the years Bunsei 10–12 (1827–1829) when its appearances was supposedly witnessed. (Note: Hosoki's paper regards 4 out of 7 "kutabe" group primary documents as datable to Bunsei 10 or 11 (1827 or 1828), and regards her number 7 (Dōchō tosetsu)as "no date" which Nagano assigns to Spring of Bunsei 12 (1829).)

The kanji-titled pamphlet claims that 件 (here presumably pronounced "ken" rather than "kudan") is actually its Chinese name, while kutabe is the true Japanese name.

=== Nomenclature ===
The kutabe's name is written in non-standard "kanji" characters (shown right) in the printed example. (Note: The first character consists of the 'person' radical 亻 on the left and the right half composed of 久 atop 田. The second character consists of the 'dog/beast' radical 犭 on the left, with 部 on the right. Note that " 久田部" together could be read as "kutabe" in Japanese.) and also variously transcribed as kutabe (くたべ) in hiragana, or kudabe (クダベ) and kudahe (クタヘ) in katakana, etc. The name also appears as either gudabe (ぐだべ) or gutabe (具多遍) in an example now in France. (Note: Ken'ei rōgasō jūi 8 shū 3 (「献英楼画叢拾遺 八集三」), also titled u 2 no 3, "saii" (「う二ノ三」「災異」, "cataclysm")(One of 4 volumes of scrapbooks called Harikomichō (「貼込帳」), formerly in the collection of Tayasu Tokugawa clan), now in the Kreitmann Collection. Reproduced in Alain Briot (2013).。Hosoki 2020, note (42).) (Note: On the item (Ken'ei rōgasō jūi 8 shū 3) in the Kreitmann Collection, cf. Tani, Hoya, and Hakoishi (2004) cited by Hosoki.)

The prophecy beast called the dodaku/dotaku (どだく/どたく) was supposedly encountered on Mt. Tate by a man named Miura according to the diary of Kōriki Tanenobu, and thus this beast is also considered a variant in the kutabe group.

=== Iconography of the kutabe ===
The kutabe/kudabe group illustrations appear to scholars as having long-haired woman-like face, while others have the head of a bald old man, (Note: Hosoki's No. 1) or with resemblance to a "fatigued medical monk's body", (Note: Hosoki's No. 4) and lack obvious discernible bovine features, (Note: Nagano, in a paper on the amabie and other prophetic beast states that in the "kudabe group" of the period, "cattle-like features cannot necessarily be seen 必ずしも牛らしさが見られない" on them.) but and are given front and hind paws with sharp claws (Note: No. 1 print and No. 1 hand-painted kutahe.) (rather than hooves).

=== Prophecy and warding ===
The prophecies and the instructions to ward off evil are nearly identical in the various attestations of the kutabe group; the prophecy beast warns of an outbreak of some unknown disease in 4, 5 years time, and instructs that an individual must view the image of the creature once, in order to avoid the catastrophe.

The "gudabe" example (in the French collection) prescribes that in addition to viewing the image of itself, if an individual gathers seven-colored herbs, pound them into mochi (rice cake) and eats them, the wonders it would do will be "like unto a god".

Comparison to Hakutaku

A comparison study of some 7 examples of the "kutabe" subclass was conducted by Hitomi Hosokawa, who addresses some of the origin questions; the questions of have been pursued by others also (cf. §Origins). The origins of the "kutabe" subclass has been discussed by Hosoki Regarding whether the kutabe could have originated from the Bai Ze (Hakutaku), she found mixed results in comparing their physical depictions/ (Note: Several kutabes are depicted with women-like faces (unlike the male man faced Hakutaku), and some of the women-faced examples did have eyes on the body (like Hakutaku), though nearer the back/spine than its flanks, as iterated below.) And as curator of the museum at Tateyama, she concluded that the kutabe sub-legend never developed locally, but was probably invented by outsiders residing in other provinces.

== Origins ==
The kudan may derive from the Chinese luck beast Bai Ze (pronounced "Hakutaku" in Japanese), (Note: Miyatake Gaikotsu (1931) appears to make an early connection between the hakutaku to the kudan.) as has been formally theorized by sociologist Kenji Sato (1995, Kudan no tanjō [The Birth of Kudan]). The custom of distributing the image of Bai Ze existed in Edo Period Japan, (Note: For example, at Mount Togakushi or Mount Hakkai, pilgrims were handed out disaster-warding amulets with Bai Ze depicted on them (bearing the title Hakutaku hikaizu (白沢避怪図; lit. "Hakutaku monster-evading image").) and its iconography was likely borrowed to create the kudan creature.

The traditional Chinese Bai Ze actually tended to be depicted as more beastlike, or "tiger-faced, scaly-bodied" to be more specific. But in Japan, it later became more commonplace for the Bai Ze (Hakutaku) to be drawn or painted as human-faced and beast-bodied, hence not much different in appearance from the kudan which emerged.

=== Jinjahime and Hakutaku origins ===
The essay Dōchō tosetsu (道聴塗説) from the Edo Period claims that the "kudabe" (variant spelling) was an invention based on another prophecy beast called the jinjahime (神社姫) (Note: ".. jinjahime and himeuo with female faces and bodies of fish".) which was circulating at the time. It has been pointed out that the jinjahime that manifested itself in Bunsei 2 (1819) gave instructions on how to avoid the foretold doom, like the kudan in later documents, but whether the kudan of Bunsei 2 did so is inconclusive. (Note: This kudan of early record—- the same year (1819) as this jinjahime—- is attested in a diary entry (Mikkyoku nichijō (密局日乗), Bunsei 2, 13th day of 5th month, so it is not necessarily a complete record.)

Another proponent who equated the kutabe with the luck beast Hakutaku (Bai Ze) was the famous yōkaimanga author Shigeru Mizuki, who viewed kutabe as a "human-faced bovine, with eyes on both flanks of its belly", just like Hakutaku. This is somewhat disputed by Hosoki, since the kutabe does indeed have eyes on its body, but they are situated on its back (next to spine), if the woodblock-printed image is taken to be authoritative. (Note: However, the placement of eyes in a hand-painted kutabe (document with Matsudaira clan provenance) is less certain. Hosoki herself says there are "two eyes on the spot which seems to be its back", though Sasakata is less wavering and states these are "eyes on its back 背中の目".) But at any rate this is coincidence enough to conclude that the iconography of the kutabe was influenced by Hakutaku amulets.

Mizuki also saw some connection between the medicine god Yellow Emperor meeting Bai Ze/Hakutaku and the supposed Toyama medicine peddler (Note: Strictly speaking, just a "person/man digging up medicinal ingredients", so somebody in the supply chain of the Toyama medicine peddling business.) meeting the kudan in Mount Tate of Toyama. But Hosoki does not find this connection to the "patron god of Traditional Chinese medicine" to be persuasive enough to demonstrate equivalence.

Although the kutabe legend situates the encounter in Mount Tate, Toyama, Hosokawa found no evidence that the legend was being told locally, having consulted various temples connected with the mountain, (Note: She visited the temples and shrines near the epicenter of the Tateyama shugen, i.e. the shugendō cult of Mount Tate, and others connected with the mountain, even outside the prefecture.) and examining the writings left by pilgrims preserved at these establishments. The Medicinal mound-monument at Tateyama (立山の薬種塚) mentioned in the legend also appears to be spurious. Thus she concludes this legend to have been concocted by an outsider, who wanted to exploit the reputation all over Japan that Mount Tate was a mystic place where rare or potent medicinal ingredients could be found.

== Ushi-onna ==
Mimei Ogawa published a short novel called "Ushi-onna" ('cow-woman', 1919), probably having read Hyakken's story "Kudan".

Subsequently, during the period of post war reconstruction which followed World War II, rumours began to surface regarding the appearances of a ushi-onna (牛女; lit. "cow woman"), who was somewhat akin to kudan but was bovine-headed and human-bodied rather than the other way around, and wore traditional kimono dress.

Sakyo Komatsu also wrote a piece of fiction entitled Kudan no haha (「くだんのはは」; lit. "kudan's mother") (1968), which was also probably based on the knowledge of Hyakken's story, and on further collected folkloric material. Komatsu's story is thought to have significantly influenced the furtherance of the ushi-onna urban legend in Japan.

The ushi-onna lore was circulated particularly in the vicinity of city of Kobe, namely the Nishinomiya and Mount Kabuto areas in Hyogo Prefecture, (Note: Kobe beef is of course famous brand name for wagyū beef. Reports of kudan in the Tajima cattle growing area north of Kobe is noted below.) and it was rumored that the ushi-onna was seen devouring animal carcasses in the airstruck ruins. And after the entire corridor from Ashiya to Nishinomiya got devastated by air bombings, there floated a rumor that an ushi-onna loitered the butcher's house that was burned down and in ruins, the daughter of the family who was kept sequestered in a zashikirō room, away from the eyes of the public.

The writer Hirokatsu Kihara (Note: Known as current owner of a kudan mummy. Cf. infra.) argues that the kudan and the ushi-onna ought to be distinguished, due to a number of differences: the kudan is a calf born from cattle, the ushi-onna is a daughter of human parents; the kudan is human-faced and bovine-bodied, the ushi-onna the other way around; the kudan is actually the one capable of human speech, whereas the cow-woman's ability to speak is unattested.

== Chronology ==
From the Edo period through Shōwa period, there have been several reported sightings throughout Japan, though they are most often reported in Western Japan.

=== Edo period ===
The kudan allegedly appeared as early as the 12th month of Hōei 2 (1705) according to "old documents", but this is only purported by the kawaraban of 1836, and not verified by contemporary evidence.

An early attestation that a calf proclaiming itself to be a kudan was born at a commoner's cow in Kaminoseki, Suō Province is recorded in the diary called Mikkyoku nichijō (『密局日乗』), the entry dated to Bunsei 2, 5th month, 13th day (4 July 1819). The creature was capable of human speech, and instructed that it should be given the name "kudan", and it should not be slaughtered on account of its odd form. It predicted 7 consecutive years of bountiful harvest, but war trouble on the 8th year.

The attestations to the "kutabe" or "kudabe" group date to Bunsei 10–12 (1827–1829), as already discussed. The kutabe/kudabe were allegedly witnessed on Mount Tate, Toyama in the north, but the source material were discovered in places like Osaka or Nagoya.

The news of a "kutabe", after a time gap, is attested from the Kaei era (1848–1854), according to Nagano; the surimono (wood-block print) of the "kutabe" written in kanji is itself undated, but is pasted into the scrapbook called Hogochō, which began to be compiled in the year Kaei 4 (1851).

The news of the "kudan" disseminated in the kawaraban (woodblock printed broadside) (Note: Or artefact printed on wood) dated Tenpō 7 (1836) is the earliest extant written folkloric material on the "kudan" proper. This spread of the kudan lore coincided with the time of the Tenpō famine, so there may have been an invested hope of bountiful harvest in creating such a charm artefact, according to Hiromi Shimada.

=== Meiji Restoration onward ===
On June 21, 1909, a Nagoya newspaper reported a sighting of the kudan. According to the article, a calf had been born with a human face a decade before in a farmhouse on the Gotō Islands. It reported that "It died only 31 days after its birth and prophesied a war between Japan and Russia." The calf was later stuffed and put on display in the Yahiro Museum in Nagasaki. The museum has since closed and the calf's whereabouts are unknown. (Note: Section: Hizen no kudan ▽肥前の「件」, "Kisha kurige 汽車栗毛", Nagoya shimbun, 21 June Meiji 42/1909. Quoted in Yumoto 1999, p. 117. Miyatake (1931) also quotes the newspaper, but assigns the date Meiji 38.)

From the Meiji period onward, stuffed carcasses of cattle and swine purported to be kudan" were being exhibited at "spectacle show shacks" (misemonogoya (見世物小屋)). Lafcadio Hearn (Glimpses of Unfamiliar Japan, vol. 2, 1894) recorded the incident in 1892 about a travelling showmen who brought a stuffed kudan aboard a ship bound for Mihonoseki. Their unholy conduct of transporting the kudan, a tiger and other dead animals was blamed by the priest for the sudden squall, which forced the ship to abandon disembarking at Mihonoseki and turn back.

The theory about the kudan being a benevolent wish-granting creature subsided during the Shōwa period and was replaced by greater emphasis on the kudan's wartime prophecies. A kudan appeared in 1930 in a forest in Kagawa Prefecture, prophesying: "Soon, there will be a great war. You shall win, but you will later be struck down by plague. However, those who eat red beans and tie yarn around their wrists within three days of hearing this prophecy shall not fall sick". In 1933, this rumor reached Nagano Prefecture and quickly spread, with elementary school students spreading it further by taking red bean rice (azuki-meshi) into school for their lunches. However, the content of the rumor changed. Instead of a kudan, the prophecy was attributed to a snake-headed beast, sent by the deity of the Suwa Grand Shrine in Nagano Prefecture. (Note: Cf. Mishaguji. The rumour in Nagano Prefecture is said to have developed from the rumours about a prophecying child given birth the previous year in 1932 by an 80-year old woman in Hokkaido, after she received message from the Amida Buddha.)

A rumour of a kudan birth in Hirado, Nagasaki was propagated via Sasebo, and eventually collected in the summer of 1932 in Omadaka village in Nishisonogi Peninsula by folklorist Katsunori Sakurada. (Note: Katsunori Sakurada (桜田勝徳), "Enoshima Hirashima ki" (江島平島記), in "Mikan saihōki" (未刊採訪記) or "Unpublished travelogues".)

During World War II, many rumors were spread about prophecies regarding the war and air raids. In 1943, a kudan was said to have been born in a geta shop in Iwakuni. This kudan predicted that "the war will end next year, around April or May." It was then reported in the spring of 1945 in Matsuyama that "A Kudan has been born in Kobe. He says that 'anyone who consumes red beans or bean cakes within three days of hearing this tale shall escape the air raids.'" The rumors quickly circulated throughout Matsuyama.

Around early 1944 in the area of Marília, Brazil, there spread a rumour among the Japanese immigrants that a human headed and beast-bodied kudango (件子) was born, which predicted that the "war will end within the year with the Axis powers winning great vicotory"; it supposedly died immediately after speaking the stock phrase "yotte kudan no gotoshi" (roughly, "therefore, it is just like the matter [I have talked about]"). This has been characterized as the burgeoning of the denialist logic of espoused by the Kachigumi group who refused to believe Japan could lose a war.

Kudan birth anecdotes have also been heard in the villages that produce the Tajima cattle brand of Kobe beef (published 1953). And in Hiruzen sanson or "the three villages of Hiruzen", Okayama Prefecture, an elderly informant in the Yatsuka village spoke of a kudan, but when inquired of its whereabouts he answered it was born in Kawakami village, and so forth, so the investigator was run in circles (1971).

Writer Hirokatsu Kihara in 2004 came into possession of a stuffed kudan, also being touted to as the kudan mummy, from a man residing in Gunma Prefecture, who was the son of a kōgyōshi (興行師) or travelling showman, who called the ushi-ningen (牛人間) or "cow/bull-human", and put it on exhibit, together with the performance of a kamishibai sliding-picture show about this creature.。

== Media appearances ==
=== Literature ===
- Kudan, a collection of short stories by Hyakken Uchida
- Kudan Monster by Rin Adashino
- The Kudan's Mother by Sakyo Komatsu
- Therefore, It Is as Written (依って件の如し, Yotte Kudan no Gotoshi), short story by Shimako Iwai
- Would you Like to Talk About Kudan? by Yasujirō Uchiyama

=== Manga ===
- A Terrified Teacher at Ghoul School!
- GeGeGe no Kitarō
- Jigoku Sensei Nūbē (Vol. 11, Ch. 93)
- Kudan no Gotoshi
- Kyokou Suiri
- Nijigahara Holograph
- Pet Shop of Horrors: Tokyo (Vol. 11, Ch. 39)
- Tsubasa: Reservoir Chronicle (Vol. 2)

=== Movies ===
- The Great Yokai War

=== Video games ===
- Aoi Shiro
- Hayarigami 3
- Kamaitachi no Yoru 2: Song of the Prison Island
- Segare Ijiri
- Shining Force III
- Shin Megami Tensei: Devil Summoner: Raidou Kuzunoha vs. The Soulless Army
- Toppa-ra: Zashiki Warashi no wa Nashi
- Yo-Kai Watch 2 – the English dub calls him by the name Predictabull
