= Kudan no Gotoshi =

Japanese manga series

クダンノゴトシ
- Manga
- Written by: Jun Watanabe
- Published by: Kodansha
- Imprint: Young Magazine KC
- Magazine: Weekly Young Magazine
- Original run: 2015 – 2017
- Volumes: 6

Kudan no Gotoshi (クダンノゴトシ) is a Japanese horror manga series written and illustrated by Jun Watanabe. It was serialized in Weekly Young Magazine, a seinen manga magazine published by Kodansha, from 2015 to 2017. The series was collected in six tankōbon volumes. The manga blends elements of Japanese folklore, particularly the yōkai known as the kudan, with modern horror tropes.

== Plot ==
The story begins when seven university students from Joei University return home after their graduation trip. During their drive, their car collides with an unusual creature resembling a calf with a human face. The students later learn that this being is a kudan, a mythical yōkai said to appear as an omen of disaster and to predict death. After the accident, the students are cursed with the knowledge that they will die in exactly seven days. The manga follows their attempts to uncover the mystery behind the kudan, escape their fate, and reconcile with their own secrets. As the week progresses, each character faces increasingly severe supernatural phenomena and psychological strain. The narrative intertwines personal backstories, guilt, and fear, ultimately examining how individuals respond to an inescapable prophecy.

== Title ==
The title itself references a well-known Japanese idiom. The first known reference ("仍例進上如件") to this phrase dates back to The Pillow Book, written around 1000 CE during the Heian period. This phrase was traditionally appended to newspaper articles to establish their credibility and was also included in wills to affirm their absolute truth and righteousness. Since the kudan is believed to never lie, any statement followed by Kudan no Gotoshi (件の如し)—meaning as the kudan says or true as the kudan—must be accepted as truthful. Unlike in the manga's context, the kudan's image and likeness were traditionally associated with positive meanings - good luck, protection from illnesses, and prosperity. The creature's picture was commonly used on talismans for these beneficial purposes.

== Characters ==
=== The seven students ===
A group of recent graduates who serve as the story's protagonists. Each has unique personal struggles and hidden aspects of their past, revealed gradually through the curse's progression.

- Hikaru Tsujimoto (辻元 光, Tsujimoto Hikaru)
  He is the only one in the group who leaves the University with no job offers. Hikaru is deeply tied to the cursed kudan phenomenon. He has a strange history (including being run over as a child) that suggests he may not be entirely present in a normal sense. He is burdened with guilt, secrets, and existential dread. As the plot progresses, he becomes more of a focal point: some suspect him of being the kudan or having multiple or clone selves.
  Chizuru Sakurai (櫻井 千鶴, Sakurai Chizuru)
  Hikaru's girlfriend and a level-headed member of the group. She has a job offer at a printing company. Chizuru is thoughtful, caring, and one of the more emotionally grounded among the group. She is close to others, acts as a moral center at times, and seems motivated to understand both the supernatural threat and support her friends. She also carries personal emotional burdens (family, past). Her father leaves prophetic material that becomes important.
  Mai Kawai (河合 舞, Kawai Mai)
  Mai is more vulnerable, sometimes physically or emotionally fragile, and her parts of the story often focus on fear, survival, and relationships to the other characters. She provides contrast to some of the stronger, more proactive members.
  Shinji Fujisawa (藤澤 伸司, Fujisawa Shinji)
  A calm and rational member of the group who has secured employment at a publishing company. Shinji often acts as the mediator during conflicts, though even he is shaken as the deadline draws near. Shinji tends to act more rationally, trying to investigate, skeptical but also pulled in by the curse. He's flawed, has doubts, and often is between action and despair.
  Yota Onodera (小野寺 陽太, Odonera Yōta)
  Yōta appears in later chapters more prominently; he gets involved in trying to understand what's happening, sometimes serving to contrast with more reckless or irrational characters. He is one of the more outside, reactive members. Often portrayed as an everyman figure.
  Ayumi Baba (馬場 あゆみ, Baba Ayumi)
  A spirited student with a job lined up at a sporting goods manufacturer. She is competitive and outspoken, contributing energy to the group dynamic but also clashing with others under stress. Ayumi is one of the seven students whose storyline highlights personal background, emotional tension, and the way the curse forces each of them to confront past mistakes or regrets.
  Tatsumi Shiraishi (白石 辰巳, Tatsumi Shiraishi)
  Outgoing and somewhat of a class clown, Tatsumi is set to inherit his family's convenience store. He often uses humor to mask his anxiety but becomes increasingly serious as events escalate. Early in the manga, Tatsumi plays a role in setting up the group dynamics; his traits include being more blunt or direct, sometimes acting as a foil to the more cautious, emotional ones. He, like the others, is forced to face the supernatural and existential crisis.

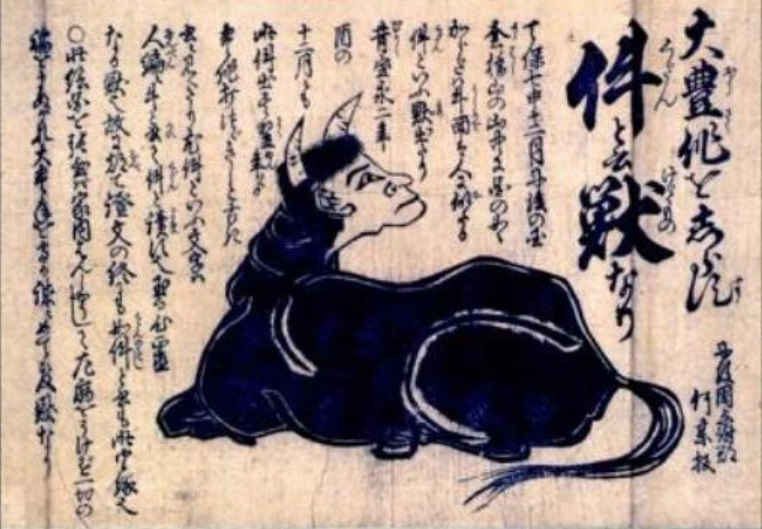
The kudan of "Mount Kurahashi", Tango Province. This picture appears early on in the manga, when the students start their research.

=== The kudan ===
A supernatural entity from Japanese folklore. In this narrative, the kudan is portrayed as a deceptive entity capable of mimicking both the appearance and voice of other people. It typically manifests with a bovine body bearing the face of its most recent victim, using this form to prophesy who will die next. When under stress or confronting barriers, the creature employs deliberate psychological manipulation on others, appearing instead with a human physique topped by a cow's head. The kudan follows a predetermined sequence for the students' deaths rather than allowing random fatalities. Those not yet destined to die according to this fixed order remain essentially immortal - they may sustain injuries and bleed, but cannot be killed by any means until their appointed time arrives.

=== The professor ===
Professor Hidemi Tachibana (橘秀美, Tachibana Hidemi)
He is a professor at the university who has been researching the kudan phenomenon more obsessively . This professor goes into unethical experimentation. He locks the students in the university basement, treating them as subjects for observing the kudan's appearances. His aim is to capture proof of the kudan's manifestation and validate his theories pushing beyond folklore into science. He even involves a surgeon, persuading him to carry out procedures to test ideas about the curse's transmission and the kudan's biology. In essence, he represents the dark side of scholarship: curiosity without ethics, using the curse as an opportunity to pursue fame or recognition.

== Influences, and references ==
Although it is not a direct adaptation, the core ideas for the story lie in other horror classics such as Kōji Suzuki's 1991 novel - Ring - or the 2000s Final Destination franchise, particularly in the use of the 'seven days to live' element and the Rube Goldberg–like chain reaction of deaths experienced by the main characters. In Kudan no Gotoshi, the protagonists encounter a prophetic kudan that foretells their deaths within a fixed time limit, echoing the cursed videotape premise in Ring and the death-countdown mechanism of Final Destination. Jun Watanabe adapts the Final Destination franchise's fatalistic structure to a folkloric framework centred on yokai prophecy. While the films portray death as an abstract supernatural force, the manga grounds its narrative in local legend while maintaining the suspense of elaborate, inevitable death sequences. Watanabe himself explained that his shift towards horror was not conceived as a deliberate challenge but rather as a personal decision to create the kinds of stories he wanted while he still could.

== Style ==
Kudan no Gotoshi employs a visual and narrative style characteristic of horror works aimed at a young adult male (seinen) demographic. The series features graphic depictions of violence and gore, with several deaths presented in elaborate, sudden, and often shocking ways that mirror the structure of suspense-thriller cinema. Its frenetic pacing—driven by the seven-day countdown and the sequence of unpredictable deaths—aligns it with contemporary serialized horror targeted at adult readers, maintaining constant tension across its six volumes.

The manga also explores the psychological toll of the curse on its ensemble cast: paranoia, guilt, and the erosion of group trust are central themes as the characters' impending deaths become increasingly inevitable. Critics have noted that these psychological elements, combined with the visceral horror, differentiate it from more teen-oriented (shōnen) horror by emphasizing despair and moral collapse rather than action-driven resistance.

Jun Watanabe's artwork has been praised for its detailed, strong, striking linework and its use of close-up panels to heighten emotional intensity. Death scenes are often framed with cinematic angles and sharp contrasts, contributing to a sense of immediacy and impact. This combination of explicit gore, psychological horror, and bold visual composition aligns the series closely with other adult-oriented horror manga serialized in Weekly Young Magazine.

== Reception ==
The series received a mixed reception from readers and critics. Positive responses highlighted the strong opening premise, the unsettling atmosphere, and the use of yokai folklore in a contemporary setting. Criticism focused on the later chapters, which were described as abrupt, with supernatural elements that did not fully align with earlier foreshadowing. The ending in particular was noted for being rushed, leaving several plot threads unresolved. Despite this, the series developed a following among fans of short, high-concept horror manga.

== List of volumes ==
Volumes
No.	Original Japanese release date	Original ISBN
1	December 4, 2015: 辻元光＜其ノ壱> Hikaru Tsujimoto <Part 1>; 白石辰巳＜其ノ壱> Tatsumi Shiraishi <Part 1>; 白石辰巳＜其ノ弐> Tatsumi Shiraishi <Part 2>; 馬場あゆみ<其ノ壱> Ayumi Baba <Part 1>; 馬場あゆみ＜其ノ弐> Ayumi Baba <Part 2>; 馬場あゆみ＜其ノ参> Ayumi Baba <Part 3>; 桜井千鶴＜其ノ壱> Chizuru Sakurai <Part 1>	ISBN 978-4-06-382717-0
2	March 4, 2016: 桜井千鶴＜其ノ弐> Chizuru Sakurai <Part 2>; 桜井千鶴＜其ノ参> Chizuru Sakurai <Part 3>; 馬場あゆみ＜其ノ四＞ Ayumi Baba <Part 4>; 馬場あゆみ＜其ノ五＞ Ayumi Baba <Part 5>; 馬場あゆみ＜其ノ六＞ Ayumi Baba <Part 6>; 馬場あゆみ＜其ノ七＞ Ayumi Baba <Part 7>; 馬場あゆみ＜其ノ八＞ Ayumi Baba <Part 8>; 藤澤伸司＜其ノ壱> Shinji Fujisawa <Part 1>; 藤澤伸司＜其ノ弐> Shinji Fujisawa <Part 2>; 藤澤伸司＜其ノ参> Shinji Fujisawa <Part 3>	ISBN 978-4-06-382748-4
3	June 6, 2016: 藤澤伸司＜其ノ四＞ Shinji Fujisawa <Part 4>; 辻元光＜其ノ弐> Hikari Tsujimoto <Part 2>; 河合舞＜其ノ壱> 藤澤伸司＜其ノ五＞ Mai Kawai <Part 1> Shinji Fujisawa <Part 5>; 藤澤伸司＜其ノ六＞ 小野寺洋太＜其ノ壱> Shinji Fujisawa <Part 6> Yota Onodera <Part 1>; 藤澤伸司＜其ノ七＞ 小野寺洋太＜其ノ弐> Shinji Fujisawa <Part 7> Yota Onodera <Part 2>; 藤澤伸司＜其ノ八＞ 河合舞＜其ノ弐> Shinji Fujisawa <Part 8> Mai Kawai <Part 2>; 藤澤伸司＜其ノ九＞ 河合舞＜其ノ参> Shinji Fujisawa <Part 9> Mai Kawai <Part 3>; 藤澤伸司＜其ノ拾＞ 河合舞＜其ノ四＞ Shinji Fujisawa <Part 10> Mai Kawai <Part 4>; 辻元光＜其ノ参> Hikari Tsujimoto <Part 3>; 辻元光＜其ノ四＞ Hikari Tsujimoto <Part 4>	ISBN 978-4-06-382802-3
4	September 6, 2016: 辻元光＜其ノ五＞ 桜井千鶴＜其ノ四＞ Hikaru Tsujimoto <Part 5> Chizuru Sakurai <Part 4>; 辻元光＜其ノ六＞ 桜井千鶴＜其ノ五＞ Hikaru Tsujimoto <Part 6> Chizuru Sakurai <Part 5>; 辻元光＜其ノ七＞ Hikaru Tsujimoto <Part 7>; 辻元光＜其ノ八＞ Hikaru Tsujimoto <Part 8>; 辻元光＜其ノ九＞ Hikaru Tsujimoto <Part 9>; 小野寺洋太＜其ノ参> 藤澤伸司＜其ノ拾壱＞ Yota Onodera <Part 3> Shinji Fujisawa <Part 11>; 辻元光＜其ノ拾＞ Hikaru Tsujimoto <Part 10>; 辻元光＜其ノ拾壱＞ Hikaru Tsujimoto <Part 11>; 辻元光＜其ノ拾弐＞ 河合舞＜其ノ五＞ Hikaru Tsujimoto <Part 12> Mai Kawai <Part 5>; 辻元光＜其ノ拾参＞ 桜井千鶴＜其ノ六＞ Hikaru Tsujimoto <Part 13> Chizuru Sakurai <Part 6>	ISBN 978-4-06-382843-6
5	December 6, 2016: 辻元光＜其ノ拾四＞ 桜井千鶴＜其ノ七＞ Hikaru Tsujimoto <Part 14> Chizuru Sakurai <Part 7>; 辻元光＜其ノ拾五＞ 桜井千鶴＜其ノ八＞ Hikaru Tsujimoto <Part 15> Chizuru Sakurai <Part 8>; 辻元光＜其ノ拾六＞ 桜井千鶴＜其ノ九＞ Hikaru Tsujimoto <Part 16> Chizuru Sakurai <Part 9>; 辻元光＜其ノ拾七＞ 桜井千鶴＜其ノ拾＞ Hikaru Tsujimoto <Part 17> Chizuru Sakurai <Part 10>; 辻元光＜其ノ拾八＞ 桜井千鶴＜其ノ拾壱＞ Hikaru Tsujimoto <Part 18> Chizuru Sakurai <Part 11>; 河合舞＜其ノ六＞ Mai Kawai <Part 6>; 辻元光＜其ノ拾九＞ 桜井千鶴＜其ノ拾弐＞ Hikaru Tsujimoto <Part 19> Chizuru Sakurai <Part 12>; 辻元光＜其ノ弐拾> Hikaru Tsujimoto <Part 20>; 辻元光＜其ノ弐拾壱> 桜井千鶴<其ノ拾参＞ Hikaru Tsujimoto <Part 21> Chizuru Sakurai <Part 13>; 辻元光＜其ノ弐拾弐> 桜井千鶴<其ノ拾四＞ Hikaru Tsujimoto <Part 22> Chizuru Sakurai <Part 14>; 藤澤伸司＜其ノ拾弐＞ Shinji Fujisawa <Part 12>; 河合舞＜其ノ七＞ Mai Kawai <Part 7>	ISBN 978-4-06-382889-4
6	March 6, 2017: 辻元光＜其ノ弐拾参> Hikaru Tsujimoto <Part 23>; 辻元光＜其ノ弐拾四> 桜井千鶴＜其ノ拾五＞ Hikaru Tsujimoto <Part 24> Chizuru Sakurai <Part 15>; 辻元光＜其ノ弐拾五> Hikaru Tsujimoto <Part 25>; 辻元光＜其ノ弐拾六> Hikaru Tsujimoto <Part 26>; 辻元光＜其ノ弐拾七> Hikaru Tsujimoto <Part 27>; 桜井千鶴<其ノ拾六＞ Chizuru Sakurai <Part 16>; 辻元光＜其ノ弐拾八> Hikaru Tsujimoto <Part 28>; 辻元光＜其ノ弐拾九> Hikaru Tsujimoto <Part 29>; 辻元光＜其ノ参拾> 桜井千鶴<其ノ拾七＞ Hikaru Tsujimoto <Part 30> Chizuru Sakurai <Part 17>; 辻元光＜其ノ参拾壱> Hikaru Tsujimoto <Part 31>; 件の如し Kudan no Gotoshi	ISBN 978-4-06-382931-0
