= List of Pet Shop of Horrors chapters =

The cover of the first volume of Pet Shop of Horrors as published by Tokyopop on June 17, 2003, in North America.

The chapters of Pet Shop of Horrors (ペットショップ オブ ホラーズ, Pettoshoppu obu Horāzu) are written and illustrated by Matsuri Akino. The chapters were collected in ten bound volumes and published in Japan by Ohzora Publishing.

== Volume list ==
=== Pet Shop of Horrors ===
No.	Original release date	Original ISBN	North American release date	North American ISBN
01	February 1995	978-4-391-91521-1	June 17, 2003	978-1-59182-363-6
01. "Dream"; A girl buys an exotic male bird who sings really beautifully to her, until she buys an exotic female partner for his precious bird, where everything turns wrong.: 02. "Despair"; A movie star appears dead and the pet store is involved.: 03. "Daughter"; A mother´s love clouds the mind, a father buys a special rabbit, and everything goes wrong when they break the 3-clause contract.: 04. "Dreizehn"; A rich blind girl bought a Dog that will protect her until his death..
02	September 1995	978-4-391-91549-5	August 12, 2003	978-1-59182-364-3
05. "Dragon"; When a common turtle egg is switched with a dragon's, Count D and Detective Orcot rush to stop a Christmas surprise from turning into a disaster.: 06. "Dice"; Luck be a kitten named Lady tonight. Can a brush with Count D turn around the life of one small time gambler?: 07. "Delicious "; The "fish" that Ethan Grey just purchased from Count D bears a striking resemblance to his recently drowned wife. A coincidence... or a ghost?: 08. "Destruction"; After Leon falls asleep on the job, D visits him in his dream to give him a lesson in ecology.
03	January 1996	978-4-391-91575-4	October 13, 2003	978-1-59182-365-0
09. "Diamonde"; Officer Orcot is charged with protecting a marked woman, but even Orcot never would have expected the Count to be the assassin.: 10. "Desire"; Young Maggie is bored with her dog. When Count D offers her a much more exciting pet in exchange, will Maggie grow tired of it as well...or will the pet tire of her new master?: 11. "Dessert"; A string of high-profile disappearances has Officer Orcot hobnobbing with the city's elite, but after catching the Count in their midst, his list of suspects is shortened to one name.: 12. "Devil"; After a chance meeting seems to stir up long forgotten memories in an old woman, Count D beings to wonder whether ignorance is bliss in this emotionally moving and dramatic story.
04	June 1996	978-4-391-91601-0	January 6, 2004	978-1-59182-501-2
13. "Digital"; On firm orders from his chief, Leon reluctantly takes the murder witnesses, the victim's many tropical fish, to Count D in the hopes that the creepy pet shop owner will be able to extract any information. The Count's seemingly supernatural ways have always been fishy to Leon, but the detective is going to have to scale back his skepticism if he's going to reel in his man.: 14. "Dark Horse"; Count D falls in love with beauty in all its myriad forms, so when the eyes of a championship horse stir the fires of his aesthetic, he offers the owner things monetary and magical.: 15. "Dracula"; When Count D fits the victim profile for a local serial killer, Leon and an FBI agent are assigned to protect him. So what will working so close to the Count mean to his and Leon's love/hate relationship?: Side-story. "Flowers and the Detective Part 1"; Side-story. "Flowers and the Detective Part 2"
05	January 1997	978-4-391-91623-2	March 2, 2004	978-1-59182-502-9
16. "Dual"; When a congressman visits Count D they discover they have something in common-both make your dreams come true...for a price. But when the final vote's been tallied, this politician may be in for the upset of a lifetime.: 17. "Day Nursery "; When Leon lets his younger brother spend the day with Count D, he isn't expecting any trouble. After all, Christopher hasn't spoken a word in months. At least not to any people...: 18. "Darling"; A stray puss taken in by the Count ends up having an aristocratic pedigree. But by the time her princely owner comes to claim her, she's already developed a taste for freedom.: 19. "Dance"; Dancers and dreams coming together can be wondrous...or terribly destructive. And when their union happens at Count D's pet shop, Detective Orcot has a good idea which of the two to expect.
06	May 1997	978-4-87287-171-5	May 4, 2004	978-1-59182-503-6
20. "Discovery".; When Count D and Leon are abducted by terrorist, freedom comes in the form of a mystical jaguar.: 21. "December".; 'Twas the night before Christmas, and under the house, a creature was stirring, far more terrible than a mouse.: 22. "Distance".; The youngest daughter in a family of musicians has no talent, will a new pet sweeten her tune, or have her singing the blues.: Side-story. "Flowers and the Detective Part 3"
07	August 1997	978-4-87287-182-1	July 6, 2004	978-1-59182-504-3
23. "Doom"; After Orcot's hesitation results in the death of his partner, will Count D ease the detective's mind... or simply drive him mad?: 24. "Donor"; Count D's sister appears on the scene, and she wants to give D a piece of her heart... literally!: 25. "Duty"; A fifteen-year-old hitman has a little problem with la cosa nostra, and Orcot is the only thing that stands in the way of mob peace and all out war!: 26. "Diet"; Count D's diet plan has a simple rule: don't watch what you eat... but pay attention to what eats you!
08	December 1997	978-4-87287-199-9	September 7, 2004	978-1-59182-505-0
27. "Deep"; When Leon confronts a murderous mermaid, Count D might be the one swimming with the fishes.: 28. "Dummy"; Will a new pet keep a bickering family from fighting like cats and dogs... or end up sending them all to the kennel?: 29. "Déjà Vu"; Question: Who is Edna Hurry? Answer: A murder mystery that Leon is just dying to solve.: Side-story. "Flowers, the Detective and the Detective's Little Brother"
09	April 1998	978-4-87287-225-5	November 2, 2004	978-1-59182-506-7
30. "Duel"; A dangerous pet, capable of granting anything its owner wants, comes into the possession of a violent mafia don.: 31. "Durableness"; A child lives a nightmare in which each of her pets is found violently murdered.: 32. "Desperation"; A distressed woman, wronged by Orcot, enacts her revenge on those he holds dear... starting with Count D.: 33. "Dynasty"; A young girl is haunted by dreams from past eras, each one involving the count.
10	August 1998	978-4-87287-251-4	January 11, 2005	978-1-59532-185-5
34. "Departure"; 35. "Disappearance"; 36. "Duplication"; 37. "D"

=== Pet Shop of Horrors: Tokyo ===
No.	Original release date	Original ISBN	North American release date	North American ISBN
01	January 2005	978-4-0221-3054-9	February 12, 2008	978-1-4278-0607-9
02	September 2005	978-4-0221-3055-6	June 10, 2008	978-1-4278-0710-6
03	September 22, 2006	978-4-0221-3056-3	October 14, 2008	978-1-4278-0711-3
04	April 2007	978-4-0221-3057-0	May 1, 2009	978-1-4278-1537-8
05	December 7, 2007	978-4-0221-3108-9	July 1, 2009	978-1-4278-1592-7
06	October 7, 2008	978-4-0221-3127-0	November 1, 2009	978-1-4278-1711-2
07	November 6, 2009	978-4-0221-3148-5	October 12, 2010	978-1-4278-1858-4
08	August 6, 2010	978-4-0221-3155-3	February 1, 2011	978-1-4278-3259-7
09	September 7, 2011	978-4-0221-3169-0		
10	March 7, 2012	978-4-0221-4088-3		
11	August 7, 2012	978-4-0221-4100-2		
12	February 7, 2013	978-4-0221-4111-8		
