= List of Hell Teacher: Jigoku Sensei Nube chapters =

Fist tankōbon volume cover, released by Shueisha on January 11, 1994

This is a list of the chapters of the manga series Hell Teacher: Jigoku Sensei Nube by the duo of artist Takeshi Okano and writer Shō Makura, published in the manga anthology Weekly Shōnen Jump

== Volumes ==
=== Hell Teacher: Jigoku Sensei Nube ===
No.	Title	Japanese release date	Japanese ISBN
1	The 99-Legged Insect; Tsukumo no ashi no mushi no maki (九十九の足の虫の巻)	January 11, 1994	978-4-08-871456-1
1. "The 99-Legged Insect" (九十九の足の蟲の巻, Tsukumo no ashi no mushi no maki); 2. "The Jizō's Cruelty at Sai no Kawara" (賽の河原の地蔵虐の巻, Sai no Kawara no Jizō-gyaku no maki); 3. "Speak of the Devil, and His Shadow Appears..." (噂をすれば影...の巻, Uwasa o sureba kage... no maki); 4. "Guardian Spirit Switch! (Part 1)" (守護霊交代! の巻 （前編）, Shugorei kōtai! No maki (zenpen)); 5. "Guardian Spirit Switch! (Part 2)" (守護霊交代! の巻 （後編）, Shugorei kōtai! No maki (kōhen)); 6. "The Kappa and the Horizontal Bar" (河童と鉄棒の巻, Kappa to tetsubō no maki); Special – "Hell Teacher Nūbō (2nd Pilot)" (地獄先生ぬ～ぼ～, Jigoku sensei Nūbō)
2	Yōko: Rampage; Yōko chōryō-bakkō no maki (妖狐•跳梁跋扈の巻)	April 4, 1994	978-4-08-871457-8
7. "The Curse of Hatamonba (Part 1)" (はたもんばの呪いの巻 （前編）, Hatamonba no noroi no maki (zenpen)); 8. "The Curse of Hatamonba (Part 2)" (はたもんばの呪いの巻 （後編）, Hatamonba no noroi no maki (kōhen)); 9. "The Wandering Ghost" (散歩する幽霊の巻, Sanpo suru yūrei no maki); 10. "Collision!" (激突! の巻, Gekitotsu! No maki); 11. "Yōko: Rampage (Part 1)" (妖狐・跳梁跋扈の巻 （前編）, Yōko chōryō-bakkō no maki (zenpen)); 12. "Yōko: Rampage (Part 2)" (妖狐・跳梁跋扈の巻 （後編）, Yōko chōryō-bakkō no maki (kōhen)); 13. "Demon Hand vs. Foxfire Tail Technique" (鬼の手VS.火輪尾の術の巻, Oni no te VS Karinbi no jutsu no maki); 14. "Spirit Beast: Reimugyō (Part 1)" (霊獣・霊霧魚の巻 （前編）, Reijū Reimugyo no maki (zenpen)); 15. "Spirit Beast: Reimugyō (Part 2)" (霊獣・霊霧魚の巻 （後編）, Reijū Reimugyo no maki (kōhen))
3	The Midnight Honor Student; Mayonaka no yūtōrei no maki (真夜中の優等生の巻)	July 4, 1994	978-4-08-871458-5
16. "The Midnight Honor Student" (真夜中の優等生の巻, Mayonaka no yūtōsei no maki); 17. "The Teke Teke Mystery" (てけてけの怪の巻, Teke teke no kai no maki); 18. ""Angel-sama"" (「エンジェル様」の巻, "Enjeru-sama" no maki); 19. "The Demon 13th Staircase" (魔の13階段の巻, Ma no jūsan kaidan no maki); 20. "The Girl Who Brings Happiness" (幸せを運ぶ少女の巻, Shiawase o hakobu shōjo no maki); 21. "Gaki Soul" (餓鬼魂の巻, Gakidama no maki); 22. "The Nightly Snake" (夜毎の蛇の巻, Yogoto no hebi no maki); 23. "Doppelgänger: Another Self" (ドッペルゲンガー（もう1人の自分）の巻, Dopperugengā (mō hitori no jibun) no maki); Special – "Hell Teacher Nūbō (1st Pilot)" (地獄先生ぬ～ぼ～, Jigoku sensei Nūbō)
4	The Terrifying Kuchisake-onna; Kyōfu no Kuchisake-onna no maki (恐怖の口裂け女の巻)	October 4, 1994	978-4-08-871459-2
24. ""A" Has Come!" (「A」がきた! の巻, "A" ga kita! no maki); 25. "Otonai-san Passes Through" (おとないさんがとおるの巻, Otonai-san ga tōru no maki); 26. "One Million Letters of Misfortune" (100万枚の不幸の手紙の巻, Hyakumanmai no fukō no tegami no maki); 27. "Aliens Appear in Dōmori Town!" (宇宙人、童守町に現る! の巻, Uchūjin, Dōmori-chō ni arawaru! No maki); 28. "Three Beasts Strike!" (三匹が斬る! の巻, Sanbiki ga kiru! no maki); 29. "The Dark Face at the Bottom of the Water" (水の底の暗い顔の巻, Mizu no soko no kurai kao no maki); 30. "Lingering Snow: An Out-of-Season Yuki-onna" (なごり雪―季節はずれの雪女の巻, Nagori yuki – kisetsu hazure no yuki-onna no maki); 31. "The Terrifying Kuchisake-onna" (恐怖の口裂け女の巻, Kyōfu no Kuchisake-onna no maki); 32. "The Yōkai Rokurokubi" (妖怪ろくろ首の巻, Yōkai Rokurokubi no maki)
5	The Mystery of the Man-Eating Mona Lisa; Hitokui Mona Riza no nazo no maki (人食いモナリザの謎の巻)	December 2, 1994	978-4-08-871460-8
33. "Who Is the Fifth Person!?" (五人目は誰だ!? の巻, Goninme wa dare da!? no maki); 34. "The Mystery of the Man-Eating Mona Lisa" (人食いモナリザの謎の巻, Hitokui Mona Riza no nazo no maki); 35. "Jinmenken" (人面犬の巻, Jinmenken no maki); 36. "Near-Death Experience" (臨死体験の巻, Rinshi taiken no maki); 37. "Ushi no Koku Mairi" (丑の刻参りの巻, Ushi no koku mairi no maki); 38. "Nūbē vs. Ōtsuki-sensei" (ぬ～べ～VS大月先生の巻, Nūbē VS Ōtsuki-sensei no maki); 39. "A Forgotten Thing from 20 Years Ago" (20年前の忘れ物の巻, Nijūnen mae no wasuremono no maki); 40. "The Paired Crows" (比翼の烏の巻, Hiyoku no karasu no maki); 41. "The Seven Mysteries of Paired Mirrors" (合わせ鏡の七不思議の巻, Awase kagami no nana fushigi no maki)
6	The Ghost in Lane Four; Dai yon kōsu no yūrei no maki (第4コースの幽霊の巻)	February 3, 1995	978-4-08-871526-1
42. "The Ghost in Lane Four" (第4コースの幽霊の巻, Dai yon kōsu no yūrei no maki); 43. "Transform! Pompoko-pon" (変身! ポンポコポンの巻, Henshin! Ponpoko-pon no maki); 44. "The Piano That Plays at Night" (夜鳴るピアノの巻, Yoru naru piano no maki); 45. "Memories of a Past Life" (前世の記憶の巻, Zense no kioku no maki); 46. "Run! Ninomiya Kinjirō" (走る! 二宮金次郎の巻, Hashiru! Ninomiya Kinjirō no maki); 47. "Ghost Story: The Tree-Climbing Spirit" (怪談・木登り幽霊の巻, Kaidan ・ Kinobori yūrei no maki); 48. "The Great Yōkai Gathering!" (妖怪大集合! の巻, Yōkai daishūgō! No maki); 49. "The Midsummer Yuki-onna" (真夏の雪女の巻, Manatsu no yuki-onna no maki); 50. "The Red Chanchanko" (赤いチャンチャンコの巻, Akai chanchanko no maki)
7	The Astral Body Tug-of-War Game! Yūtai hippari gēmu! No maki (幽体ひっぱりゲームの巻)	April 4, 1995	978-4-08-871527-8
51. "The Dream-Eating Baku" (夢喰いバクの巻, Yume-kui Baku no maki); 52. "Miki's Great Jinx Operation!" (美樹のジンクス大作戦! の巻, Miki no jinkusu daisakusen! No maki); 53. "The Child-Raising Ghost" (子育て幽霊の巻, Kosodate yūrei no maki); 54. "Jinmensō" (人面疽の巻, Jinmensō no maki); 55. "Yōkai Akaname" (妖怪あかなめの巻, Yōkai Akaname no maki); 56. "Nūbē and Yukime's Ultimate Tag Team!" (ぬ～べ～・ゆきめの最強タッグ! の巻, Nūbē ・ Yukime no saikyō taggu! No maki); 57. "The Guardian Spirit Conference" (守護霊懇談会の巻, Shugorei kondankai no maki); 58. "A Great Commotion with Field Mice!" (ハツカネズミで大騒動! の巻, Hatsuka nezumi de dai sōdō! No maki); 59. "The Astral Body Tug-of-War Game!" (幽体ひっぱりゲーム! の巻, Yūtai hippari gēmu! No maki)
8	Season of the Yuki-onna; Yuki-onna no kisetsu no maki (雪女の季節の巻)	July 4, 1995	978-4-08-871528-5
60. "Kodama" (木霊の巻, Kodama no maki); 61. "A Terrifying Spirit Photograph" (恐怖の心霊写真の巻, Kyōfu no shinrei shashin no maki); 62. "Hyakki Yagyō" (百鬼夜行の巻, Hyakki yakō no maki); 63. "The Tale of the Three Kuchisake Sisters" (口裂け三姉妹物語の巻, Kuchisake sanshimai monogatari no maki); 64. "00:00:00" (0時0分0秒の巻, Reiji zero fun zero byō no maki); 65. "Season of the Yuki-onna" (雪女の季節の巻, Yuki-onna no kisetsu no maki); 66. "Nekomata" (猫又の巻, Nekomata no maki); 67. "The Mermaid's Gratitude" (人魚の恩返しの巻, Ningyo no ongaeshi no maki); 68. "The Yōkai Shōkera Peers Through the Window" (妖怪しょうけらが窓から覗くの巻, Yōkai shōkera ga mado kara nozoku no maki)
9	The Yōkai Ohaguro Bettari; Yōkai ohaguro-bettari no maki (妖怪歯黒べったりの巻)	September 4, 1995	978-4-08-871529-2
69. "The Trickster Yōkai!? Nurarihyon" (ペテン師妖怪!? ぬらりひょんの巻, Petenshi yōkai!? Nurarihyon no maki); 70. "The Piggyback Ghost" (おんぶおばけの巻, Onbu-obake no maki); 71. "Busty Yōkai: Neneko Kappa" (巨乳妖怪・弥々子河童の巻, Kyonyū yōkai・Neneko Kappa no maki); 72. "The Flapping Bald Head" (はばたきハゲ頭の巻, Habataki hage-atama no maki); 73. "The Seven Misaki" (七人ミサキの巻, Shichinin misaki no maki); 74. "The Spirit Medium Girl Izuna" (霊能力美少女イタコギャル・いずなの巻, Reinōryoku bishōjo itako gyaru ・ Izuna no maki); 75. "A Communication Line to the Afterlife" (あの世回線の巻, Ano yo kaisen no maki); 76. "Dodomeki" (百々目鬼の巻, Dodomeki no maki); 77. "The Yōkai Ohaguro Bettari" (妖怪お歯黒べったりの巻, Yōkai ohaguro-bettari no maki)
10	Nūbē Travels Through Time; Toki o kakeru Nūbē no maki (時をかけるぬ～べ～の巻)	November 2, 1995	978-4-08-871530-8
78. "Nūbē Travels Through Time" (時をかけるぬ～べ～の巻, Toki o kakeru Nūbē no maki); 79. "Showdown! Yuki-onna vs. Zashiki-warashi" (対決! 雪女VS座敷童子の巻, Taiketsu! Yuki-onna VS zashiki-warashi no maki); 80. "The Celestial Maiden's Robe" (天女の羽衣の巻, Tennyo no hagoromo no maki); 81. "A New Interpretation: The Tale of Yao Bikuni" (新説・八百比丘尼の物語の巻, Shinsetsu ・ Yao Bikuni no monogatari no maki); 82. "We Thought It Was a Building, but It Was Daidarabotchi!" (ビルだと思ったらダイダラボッチだった! の巻, Biru da to omottara Daidarabotchi datta! No maki); 83. "That Girl Is a Nopperabō!?" (あの子はのっぺらぼう!? の巻, Ano ko wa nopperabō!? No maki); 84. "Kirin" (麒麟の巻, Kirin no maki); 85. "Meat Man" (肉人の巻, Niku-jin no maki); 86. "Nūbē Buys a Foreign Car" (ぬ～べ～、外車を買うの巻, Nūbē, gaisha o kau no maki)
11	The Soul-Reviving Technique; Hangon no jutsu no maki (反魂の術の巻)	January 10, 1996	978-4-08-872211-5
87. "Treasure Hunting with Fūchi!?" (フーチで宝探し!? の巻, Fūchi de takara sagashi!? No maki); 88. "Amanojaku" (天邪鬼の巻, Amanjaku no maki); 89. "The Tsurube-otoshi of the Forest of Death" (死の森の釣瓶落としの巻, Shi no mori no tsubo-otoshi no maki); 90. "Imina (Taboo Name)" (忌み名の巻, Imi na no maki); 91. "The Soul-Reviving Technique" (反魂の術の巻, Hangon no jutsu no maki); 92. "Strange Phenomenon: Old Lady Murasaki" (怪異・ムラサキババアの巻, Kaii ・ Murasaki Babā no maki); 93. "Prophetic Yōkai: Kudan" (予言妖怪・件の巻, Yogen yōkai ・ Kudan no maki); 94. "The Tan Yuki-onna" (小麦色の雪女の巻, Komugiiro no yuki-onna no maki); 95. "Grandma Is a Witch!?" (おばあさんは魔法使い!? の巻, Obāsan wa mahōtsukai!? No maki)
12	The Secret of the Demon Hand; Oni no te no himitsu no maki (鬼の手の秘密の巻)	March 4, 1996	978-4-08-872212-2
96. "The Returning Yōko: Tamamo" (帰ってきた妖狐・玉藻の巻, Kaettekita yōko・Tamamo no maki); 97. "The Strongest Enemy!?" (最強の敵!? の巻, Saikyō no teki!? No maki); 98. "Dracula the Vampire" (吸血鬼ドラキュラの巻, Kyūketsuki Dorakyura no maki); 99. "Itako Girl Izuna Performs a Summoning" (イタコギャルいずな口寄せするの巻, Itako gyaru Izuna kuchiyose suru no maki); 100. "One Hundred Tales" (百物語の巻, Hyaku monogatari no maki); 101. "A Demonic Great Invention!? The Hieronymus Machine" (Akuma no daihatsumei!? Hieronimusu mashin no maki); 102. "The Secret of the Demon Hand (Part 1)" (鬼の手の秘密 (前編), Oni no te no himitsu (zenpen)); 103. "The Secret of the Demon Hand (Part 2)" (鬼の手の秘密 (後編), Oni no te no himitsu (kōhen)); 104. "The Ghost of the Mounted Warrior" (騎馬武者幽霊の巻, Kiba musha yūrei no maki)
13	The Yuki-onna Who Vanished in the Winter Wind; Kogarashi ni kieta yuki-onna no maki (木枯らしに消えた雪女の巻)	May 10, 1996	978-4-08-872213-9
105. "Demonic Bird: Itsumade" (妖鳥・以津真天の巻, Yōchō・Izuna no maki); 106. "Yōkai: Futakuchi-onna" (妖怪・二口女の巻, Yōkai・futakuchi-onna no maki); 107. "Yōko: His Former Name" (妖狐・過去の名前の巻, Yōko・kako no namae no maki); 108. "Electrified Girl: Shiori" (帯電少女・詩織の巻, Taiden shōjo・Shiori no maki); 109. "The Secret Art of Immortality!" (不老不死の秘法! の巻, Furōfushi no hihō! no maki); 110. "The Yuki-onna Who Vanished in the Winter Wind" (木枯らしに消えた雪女の巻, Kogarashi ni kieta yuki-onna no maki); 111. "U.M.A." (U.M.A.の巻, U.M.A. no maki); 112. "Yōkai: Kanedama" (妖怪・金霊の巻, Yōkai・Kanedama no maki); 113. "The Interdimensional Pitfall" (異次元の落とし穴の巻, Ijigen no otoshiana no maki)
14	The Mysterious Spontaneous Human Combustion; Nazo no jintai hakka genshō no maki (謎の人体発火現象の巻)	July 4, 1996	978-4-08-872214-6
114. "The Happiness-Bringing Kesaran Pasaran" (幸福のケサランパサランの巻, Kōfuku no Kesaran Pasaran no maki); 115. "The Proud Werewolf" (誇り高きウェアウルフの巻, Hokori takaki ueaurufu no maki); 116. "A Great Invention with the Spirit World Communicator!" (霊界通信器で大発明! の巻, Reikai tsūshinki de daihatsumei! No maki); 117. "Do Your Best, Ritsuko-sensei!" (律子先生、がんばる! の巻, Ritsuko-sensei, ganbaru! No maki); 118. "The Mysterious Spontaneous Human Combustion" (謎の人体発火現象の巻, Nazo no jintai hakka genshō no maki); 119. "Jorōgumo" (女郎蜘蛛の巻, Jorōgumo no maki); 120. "The Parasite" (寄生虫の巻, Kiseichū no maki); 121. "The Stigmata of Fresh Blood" (鮮血の聖痕の巻, Senketsu no seikon no maki); 122. "Shock! Nūbē and Kyōko's Secret Relationship" (ショック! ぬ～べ～と郷子の(秘)関係の巻, Shokku! Nūbē to Kyōko no (hi) kankei no maki)
15	The Sorrowful Past of Zashiki-warashi; Zashiki warōji no kanashiki kako no maki (座敷童子の悲しき過去の巻)	September 4, 1996	978-4-08-872215-3
123. "The Flying Island: The Mystery of Laputa" (空飛ぶ島・ラピュータの謎の巻, Sora tobu shima・Rapyūta no nazo no maki); 124. "Bizarre: The Upside-Down School" (怪奇・逆さ学校の巻, Kaiki・Sakasa gakkō no maki); 125. "Demon Hand: Super Power-Up!?" (鬼の手・超パワーアップ!? の巻, Oni no te・Chō pawā appu!? No maki); 126. "Reunion with Yukime" (ゆきめ再会の巻, Yukime saikai no maki); 127. "Amazing Dowsing Power!" (驚異のダウジングパワー! の巻, Kyōi no daujingu pawā! No maki); 128. "The Sorrowful Past of Zashiki-warashi" (座敷童子の悲しき過去の巻, Zashiki warōji no kanashiki kako no maki); 129. "Bukimi-chan" (ブキミちゃんの巻, Bukimi-chan no maki); 130. "Hate! Hate!! Witch Teacher!?" (嫌い! きらい!! 魔女先生!? の巻, Kirai! Kirai!! Majo-sensei!? No maki); 131. "The Flesh-Growing Mask" (肉付きの面の巻, Nikuzuki no men no maki)
16	Dōmori Elementary: A Great Love Free-for-All! Dōmori-chō・Koi no daikon-sen! No maki (童守小 • 恋の大混戦！の巻)	November 6, 1996	978-4-08-872216-0
132. "Nūbē and Tamamo: A United Front" (ぬ～べ～・玉藻共同戦線の巻, Nūbē・Tamamo kyōdō sensen no maki); 133. "Alluring Yōkai: Spirit Pauchi" (お色気妖怪・精霊パウチの巻, Oiroke yōkai・Seirei Pouchi no maki); 134. "Yōkai: Maikubi" (妖怪・舞い首の巻, Yōkai・Maikubi no maki); 135. "The Man Who Fell in Love with Nure-onna" (濡れ女子に恋した男の巻, Nure joshi ni koishita otoko no maki); 136. "The Purple Mirror That Brings Death" (死を招く紫鏡の巻, Shi o maneku murasaki kagami no maki); 137. "Dimensional Yōkai: Makuragaeshi" (次元妖怪・まくらがえしの巻, Jigen yōkai・Makuragaeshi no maki); 138. "Yukime Returns to Dōmori" (ゆきめ・童守町へ帰るの巻, Yukime・Dōmori-chō e kaeru no maki); 139. "Dōmori Elementary: A Great Love Free-for-All!" (童守小・恋の大混戦! の巻, Dōmori-chō・Koi no daikon-sen! No maki); 140. "The Worldly Priest and Onmoraki" (なまぐさ坊主と陰摩羅鬼の巻, Namagusa bōzu to onmoraki no maki)
17	Nūbē Goes Abroad for the First Time; Nūbē hajimete kaigai ryokō ni iku no maki (ぬ～べ～初めて海外旅行に行くの巻)	December 25, 1996	978-4-08-872217-7
141. "Nūbē Goes Abroad for the First Time" (ぬ～べ～初めて海外旅行に行くの巻, Nūbē hajimete kaigai ryokō ni iku no maki); 142. "Choberiba with the Resurrection Incense!" (反魂香でチョベリバッ! の巻, Hangonkō de Choberibaa! no maki); 143. "Resound! Kodama" (響け! こだまの巻, Hibike! Kodama no maki); 144. "Funayūrei" (船幽霊の巻, Fune yūrei no maki); 145. "Azukiarai and the Boy" (あずき洗いと少年の巻, Azuki arai to shōnen no maki); 146. "Hayame: Idol Debut!?" (速魚・アイドルデビュー!? の巻, Hayame aidoru debyū!? No maki); 147. "Yōkai: Kerakera Woman" (妖怪けらけら女の巻, Yōkai Kerakera onna no maki); 148. "Rain, Rain, Fall Down" (雨あめふれふれの巻, Ame ame fure fure no maki); 149. "The Blood-Sucking Monster Tree" (血をすする怪木の巻, Chi o susuru kaiki no maki)
18	Nūbē: The Man Who Knows His Past; Nūbē・Kako o shiru otoko no maki (ぬ～べ～•過去を知る男の巻)	March 4, 1997	978-4-08-872218-4
150. "The Demon Beberububu Descends" (降臨悪魔ベベルブブの巻, Kōrin akuma Beberububu no maki); 151. "Grudge: Oboroguruma" (怨念・朧車の巻, Onnen・Oboroguruma no maki); 152. "Yōkai: Tsurara-onna – The Assassin from the Land of Ice!" (妖怪つらら女・氷の国から来た刺客! の巻, Yōkai Tsurara-onna・Kōri no kuni kara kita shikaku! No maki); 153. "Nūbē: The Man Who Knows His Past" (ぬ～べ～・過去を知る男の巻, Nūbē・Kako o shiru otoko no maki); 154. "Do Personal Computers Dream of Electric Sheep!?" (パソコンは電気羊の夢を見るか!? の巻, Pasokon wa denki hitsuji no yume o miru ka!? No maki); 155. "Seed-Sowing Yōkai: Tankororin" (種まき妖怪・たんころりんの巻, Tanemaki yōkai・Tankororin no maki); 156. "Though It's Sunny, It Rains!? The Fox's Wedding" (晴れているのに雨が降る? 狐の嫁入りの巻, Harete iru noni ame ga furu? Kitsune no yomeiri no maki); 157. "High-Speed Run! Jet Granny" (激走! ジェットババアの巻, Gekisō! Jetto baba no maki); 158. "A Thread Came Out!" (糸が出た! の巻, Ito ga deta! no maki)
19	Yōshin's Seven Transformations: Ayumi-chan's Great Adventure; Yōjin shichihenge・Ayumi-chan daibōken no maki (陽神七変化•あゆみちゃん大冒険の巻)	May 6, 1997	978-4-08-872219-1
159. "The Marathon Ghost" (マラソン幽霊の巻, Marason yūrei no maki); 160. "Mimic Yōkai Mishige" (人まね妖怪ミシゲーの巻, Hito mane yōkai Mishigē no maki); 161. "Yōshin's Seven Transformations: Ayumi-chan's Great Adventure" (陽神七変化・あゆみちゃん大冒険の巻, Yōjin shichihenge・Ayumi-chan daibōken no maki); 162. "Is There Really a Santa Claus?" (サンタクロースっているんでしょうか? の巻, Santa Kurōsu tte irun deshō ka? No maki); 163. "Hell Sugoroku" (地獄のすごろくの巻, Jigoku no sugoroku no maki); 164. "When Izuna's Dream Comes True" (いずな 夢かなう時の巻, Izuna yume kanau toki no maki); 165. "First Dream Grand Operation!" (初夢大作戦! の巻, Hatsuyume daisakusen! no maki); 166. "Giant Yōkai: Norikoshi Nyūdō" (巨大妖怪 乗越入道の巻, Kyodai yōkai Norikoshi Nyūdō no maki); 167. "A Miraculous Awakening" (奇跡の目覚めの巻, Kiseki no mezame no maki)
20	Nūbē and Yukime: Love's Final Showdown!? Nūbē・Yukime Ai no saishū ketchaku!? No maki (ぬ～べ～ゆきめ愛の最終決着！？の巻)	July 4, 1997	978-4-08-872220-7
168. "The Mysterious Paper of Old Man Akashiya" (明石谷老人の不思議な紙の巻, Akashidani rōjin no fushigi na kami no maki); 169. "The Final Sticker" (最後のシールの巻, Saigo no shīru no maki); 170. "Nūbē and Yukime: Love's Final Showdown!? (Part 1)" (ぬ～べ～・ゆきめ 愛の最終決着!? の巻 (前編), Nūbē・Yukime Ai no saishū ketchaku!? No maki (zenpen)); 171. "Nūbē and Yukime: Love's Final Showdown!? (Part 2)" (ぬ～べ～・ゆきめ 愛の最終決着!? の巻 (後編), Nūbē・Yukime Ai no saishū ketchaku!? No maki (kōhen)); 172. "The Easy Anywhere O-Ring" (どこでも簡単 Oリングの巻, Doko demo kantan O-ringu no maki); 173. "Class 5-3 Girls in Danger: The Pickup Artist Yōkai Yamako" (5年3組女子あやうし ナンパ妖怪・やまこの巻, 5-nen 3-kumi joshi ayau shi Nanpa yōkai・Yamako no maki); 174. "Dōmori Town Annihilated!? A Comet Summons a Plague God" (童守町死滅!? 彗星が疫病神を呼ぶの巻, Dōmori-chō shimetsu!? Suisei ga ekibyōgami o yobu no maki); 175. "OOPARTS Discovered!" (オーパーツ発見! の巻, Ōpātsu hakken! No maki); 176. "Yōkai Therapy" (妖怪セラピーの巻, Yōkai Serapī no maki)
21	Super-Dimensional Yōkai: Nozuchi; Chō kūkan yōkai・Nozuchi no maki (超空間妖怪•野槌の巻)	September 4, 1997	978-4-08-872401-0
177. "How to Create a Psychic" (霊能力者の作り方の巻, Reinōryokusha no tsukurikata no maki); 178. "D-A-N-G-E-R-O-U-S: The Training Simulation" (ア・ブ・ナ・イ育成シミュレーションの巻, A-bu-na-i ikusei shimyurēshon no maki); 179. "Find the Mandragora!" (マンドラゴラを探せ! の巻, Mandoragora o sagase! No maki); 180. "Tattletale Yōkai: Sanshi" (告げ口妖怪・三尸の巻, Tsugeguchi yōkai・Sanshi no maki); 181. "The Substitute Jizō" (身代わり地蔵の巻, Migawari jizō no maki); 182. "Minako-sensei Gets Angry! The Demon Hand's Rebellion" (美奈子先生怒る! 鬼の手の反乱の巻, Minako-sensei okoru! Oni no te no hanran no maki); 183. "The Melancholy of Dr. Tamamo" (Dr.玉藻の憂鬱の巻, Dr. Tamamo no yūutsu no maki); 184. "Super-Dimensional Yōkai: Nozuchi" (超空間妖怪・野槌の巻, Chō kūkan yōkai・Nozuchi no maki); 185. "Rescue!" (救出! の巻, Kyūshutsu! No maki)
22	Nūbē's Class Report Cards; Nūbē kurasu no tsūshinbo no maki (ぬ～べ～クラスの通信簿の巻)	November 4, 1997	978-4-08-872402-7
186. "The Story Too Scary to Be Published" (あまりに怖くて載せられなかった話の巻, Amari ni kowakute noserarenakatta hanashi no maki); 187. "Ryūgū Dōji" (龍宮童子の巻, Ryūgū dōji no maki); 188. "The Lazy Yōkai Himamushi Nyūdō" (なまけ妖怪ひまむし入道の巻, Namake yōkai Himamushi Nyūdō no maki); 189. "Nūbē's Class Report Cards" (ぬ～べ～クラスの通信簿の巻, Nūbē kurasu no tsūshinbo no maki); 190. "Gamer Yōkai: Mekurabe" (ゲーマー妖怪・目競の巻, Gēma yōkai・Mekyō no maki); 191. "Yukime Is Cheating!? Nūbē's Big Shock" (ゆきめが浮気!? ぬ～べ～大ショックの巻, Yukime ga uwaki!? Nūbē dai shokku no maki); 192. "Yōkai Homestay" (妖怪ホームステイの巻, Yōkai homestay no maki); 193. "I'm Glad I Met You" (あなたに会えてよかったの巻, Anata ni aete yokatta no maki); 194. "If You See It, You Die! Kainan Hōshi" (見たら死ぬ! 海難法師の巻, Mitara shinu! Kainan hōshi no maki)
23	The One Lurking in the Wall; Kabe no naka ni hisomu mono no maki (壁の中に潜む者の巻)	January 9, 1998	978-4-08-872503-1
195. ""Mud"" (「泥」の巻, "Doro" no maki); 196. "The Boy with Wings" (翼をもつ少年の巻, Tsubasa o motsu shōnen no maki); 197. "Collision! Tamamo vs. Izuna" (激突! 玉藻VS.いずなの巻, Gekitotsu! Tamamo VS. Izuna no maki); 198. "The One Lurking in the Wall" (壁の中に潜む者の巻, Kabe no naka ni hisomu mono no maki); 199. "Yōkai Gachapon" (妖怪ガチャポンの巻, Yōkai Gachapon no maki); 200. "The Goddess of Chance" (偶然の女神の巻, Gūzen no megami no maki); 201. "Hamaguri Nyōbō's Loving Cooking" (蛤女房の愛情クッキングの巻, Hamaguri Nyōbō no aijō cooking no maki); 202. "Fairy-Tale Miki-chan" (メルヘン美樹ちゃんの巻, Meruhen Miki-chan no maki); 203. "Dōmori Town's Greatest Battle! Part 1: The Oni Has Come!" (童守町最大の決戦! その1 鬼が来た! の巻, Dōmori-chō saidai no kessen! Sono 1 oni ga kita! No maki)
24	Dōmori Town's Greatest Battle! Dōmori-chō saidai no kessen no maki (童守町最大の決戦の巻)	April 3, 1998	978-4-08-872540-6
204. "Dōmori Town's Greatest Battle! Part 2: Izuna's Fight" (童守町最大の決戦! その2 いずなの戦いの巻, Dōmori-chō saidai no kessen! Sono 2 Izuna no tatakai no maki); 205. "Dōmori Town's Greatest Battle! Part 3: Zekki's Sudden Assault!!" (童守町最大の決戦! その3 絶鬼、急襲!! の巻, Dōmori-chō saidai no kessen! Sono 3 Zekki, kyūshū!! No maki); 206. "Dōmori Town's Greatest Battle! Part 4: The Great Reversal!" (童守町最大の決戦! その4 大逆転! の巻, Dōmori-chō saidai no kessen! Sono 4 dai gyakuten! no maki); 207. "Dōmori Town's Greatest Battle! Part 5: The Flames of Megiddo" (童守町最大の決戦! その5 滅気怒の火の巻, Dōmori-chō saidai no kessen! Sono 5 metsu ki ika no hi no maki); 208. "Dōmori Town's Greatest Battle! Part 6: The Conclusion" (童守町最大の決戦! その6 決着の巻, Dōmori-chō saidai no kessen! Sono 6 ketchaku no maki); 209. "The Soldier's Song" (兵隊さんのうたの巻, Heitai-san no uta no maki); 210. "Year's End! Namahage Appears!" (師走! なまはげ現る! の巻, Shiwasu! Namahage arawaru! No maki); 211. "Demonic Insect: Tsunemoto Mushi" (妖虫・常元虫の巻, Yōchū・Tsunemochū no maki); 212. "Hairdresser Yōkai: Kamikiri" (美容師妖怪かみきりの巻, Biyōshi yōkai Kamikiri no maki)
25	The Great Silver Love Battle!! Hakugin no dai rensen!! No maki (白銀の大恋線！！の巻)	June 4, 1998	978-4-08-872564-2
213. "Yukime's Forbidden Love!?" (ゆきめ、禁断の恋!? の巻, Yukime, kindan no koi!? No maki); 214. "Lewd Yōkai: Konaki-jiji" (ハレンチ妖怪・子泣きじじいの巻, Harenchi yōkai・Konaki Jiji no maki); 215. "Ritsuko-sensei's Counterattack!!" (逆襲のリツコ先生!! の巻, Gyakushū no Ritsuko-sensei!! No maki); 216. "Nūbē's Heart-Pounding Moment! The Birth of Rinako-sensei!?" (ぬ～べ～ドキドキ! 誕生律奈子先生!?, Nūbē dokidoki! Tanjō Ritsunako-sensei!?); 217. "The Great Silver Love Battle!!" (白銀の大恋戦!! の巻, Hakugin no dai rensen!! No maki); 218. "The Real Honto-kun" (ホントのホントくんの巻, Honto no Honto-kun no maki); 219. "Kasha: The Living Corpse" (火車・動く死体の巻, Kasha・Ugoku shitai no maki); 220. "Izuna Becomes a Mother!?" (いずな、ママになる!? の巻, Izuna, mama ni naru!? No maki)
26	Formation!! The Dōmori Youth Spirit-Attack Team; Kessei!! Dōmori shōnen yōgeki-dan no maki (結成！！ 童守少年妖撃団の巻)	September 2, 1998	978-4-08-872600-7
221. "Yōkai Artist: Toriyama Sekien" (妖怪絵師・鳥山石燕の巻, Yōkai eshi・Toriyama Sekien no maki); 222. "The Day Tamamo Becomes Human" (玉藻が人間になる日の巻, Tamamo ga ningen ni naru hi no maki); 223. "Succubus and Incubus" (サキュバスとインキュバスの巻, Sakyubasu to Inkyubasu no maki); 224. "Formation!! The Dōmori Youth Spirit-Attack Team Arc – Part 1: The Day Nūbē Disappeared" (結成!! 童守少年妖撃団編 その1 ぬ～べ～が消えた日の巻, Kessei!! Dōmori shōnen yōgeki-dan hen sono 1 Nūbē ga kieta hi no maki); 225. "Formation!! The Dōmori Youth Spirit-Attack Team Arc – Part 2: Infiltration! The Cursed Hyakkokukan" (結成!! 童守少年妖撃団編 その2 潜入! 呪いの百刻館の巻, Kessei!! Dōmori shōnen yōgeki-dan hen sono 2 sen'nyū! Noroi no Hyakkokukan no maki); 226. "Formation!! The Dōmori Youth Spirit-Attack Team Arc – Part 3: The Yōkai Doctor's Secret!!" (結成!!童守少年妖撃団編 その3 妖怪博士の秘密!! の巻, Kessei!! Dōmori shōnen yōgeki-dan hen sono 3 yōkai hakase no himitsu!! No maki); 227. "Formation!! The Dōmori Youth Spirit-Attack Team Arc – Part 4: The Threat of the Yōkai Soldiers!!" (結成!! 童守少年妖撃団編 その4 妖怪ソルジャーの脅威!! の巻, Kessei!! Dōmori shōnen yōgeki-dan hen sono 4 yōkai sorujā no kyōi!! No maki); 228. "Formation!! The Dōmori Youth Spirit-Attack Team Arc – Part 5: The Yōkai Doctor's Wife" (結成!! 童守少年妖撃団編 その5 妖怪博士の妻の巻, Kessei!! Dōmori shōnen yōgeki-dan hen sono 5 yōkai hakase no tsuma no maki); 229. "Formation!! The Dōmori Youth Spirit-Attack Team Arc – Part 6: The Great Counterattack!!" (結成!! 童守少年妖撃団編 その6 大反撃!! の巻, Kessei!! Dōmori shōnen yōgeki-dan hen sono 6 dai hangeki!! No maki)
27	Mary-san; Merī-san no maki (メリーサンの巻)	November 4, 1998	978-4-08-872625-0
230. "Formation!! The Dōmori Youth Spirit-Attack Team Arc – Part 7: Shine, Stone of Light!!" (結成!! 童守少年妖撃団編 その7 石よ 光れ!! の巻, Kessei!! Dōmori shōnen Yōgeki-dan hen Sono 7 Ishi yo hikare!! No maki); 231. "Formation!! The Dōmori Youth Spirit-Attack Team Arc – Part 8: Finishing Move: Fever Attack!!" (結成!! 童守少年妖撃団編 その8 必殺・フィーバーアタック!! の巻, Kessei!! Dōmori shōnen yōgeki-dan hen sono 8 hissatsu・Fībā Atakku!! No maki); 232. "Formation!! The Dōmori Youth Spirit-Attack Team Arc – Part 9: Activation!! The Orochi Generation Device!!" (結成!! 童守少年妖撃団編 その9 起動!! オロチ発生装置!!の巻, Kessei!! Dōmori shōnen yōgeki-dan hen sono 9 kidō!! Orochi hassei sōchi!! No maki); 233. "Formation!! The Dōmori Youth Spirit-Attack Team Arc – Part 10: A Strong Heart" (結成!! 童守少年妖撃団編 その10 強い心の巻, Kessei!! Dōmori shōnen yōgeki-dan hen sono 10 tsuyoi kokoro no maki); 234. "Formation!! The Dōmori Youth Spirit-Attack Team Arc – Part 11: The Revival of Orochi!?" (結成!! 童守少年妖撃団編 その11 復活のオロチ!? の巻, Kessei!! Dōmori shōnen yōgeki-dan hen sono 11 fukkatsu no Orochi!? No maki); 235. "Formation!! The Dōmori Youth Spirit-Attack Team Arc – Part 12: The Final Words" (結成!! 童守少年妖撃団編 その12 最後の言葉の巻, Kessei!! Dōmori shōnen yōgeki-dan hen Sono 12 saigo no kotoba no maki); 236. "Mary-san (Part 1)" (メリーさんの巻 (前編), Merī-san no maki (zenpen)); 237. "Mary-san (Part 2)" (メリーさんの巻 (後編), Merī-san no maki (kōhen)); 238. "A Scary Hospital Story" (病院の怖い話の巻, Byōin no kowai hanashi no maki)
28	Shinigami; Shinigami no maki (死神の巻)	January 8, 1999	978-4-08-872653-3
239. "Shinigami" (死神の巻, Shinigami no maki); 240. "Agyō-san" (あぎょうさんの巻, Agyō-san no maki); 241. "Oni Girl: Minki Appears!" (鬼娘・眠鬼現る! の巻, Onimusume・Minki arawaru! No maki); 242. "Are Oni Underwear Really Good Underwear!?" (鬼のパンツはいいパンツ!? の巻, Oni no pantsu wa ii pantsu!? No maki); 243. "Even an Oni Cries!?" (鬼の目にも涙!? の巻, Oni no me ni mo namida!? No maki); 244. "Walking Jumpyū" (ウォーキング・ジャンピュウの巻, Uōkingu Janpyū no maki); 245. "Tamamo's Time Limit" (玉藻の期限の巻, Tamamo no kigen no maki); 246. "Heavenly Fox: Golden-Furred Nine-Tailed Fox" (天狐・金毛玉面九尾の巻, Tenko・Kinmō gyokumen Kyūbi no maki); 247. "A Handful of Soul" (ひとにぎりの魂の巻, Hitonigiri no tamashii no maki)
29	Nūbē's Training Days!? Nūbē shugyō jidai!? No maki (ぬ～べ～修業時代!?の巻)	April 2, 1999	978-4-08-872695-3
248. "The Jar of Trials" (試練の壺の巻, Shiren no tsubo no maki); 249. "Nūbē's Training Days!?" (ぬ～べ～修行時代!? の巻, Nūbē shugyō jidai!? No maki); 250. "I Want to Call You "Big Brother"!" (お兄ちゃん! と呼びたいの巻, Oniichan! to yubitai no maki); 251. "Hiroshi Becomes Microscopic!?" (広、ミクロ化!? の巻, Hiro, mikuroka!? No maki); 252. "Spirit Talisman Master: Yang Kailun" (霊符師・ヤンカイルンの巻, Reifushi・Yan Kairun no maki); 253. "Demon Hand Rampage!!" (鬼の手、狂乱!! の巻, Oni no te, kyōran!! No maki); 254. "Clash!! Demon Hand vs. Demon Hand!!" (激突!! 鬼の手対鬼の手!! の巻, Gekitotsu!! Oni no te tai Oni no te!! No maki); 255. "How to Use the Demon Hand" (鬼の手の使い方の巻, Oni no te no tsukaikata no maki); 256. "The Yōkai Circus Has Arrived!" (妖怪サーカスがやってきた! の巻, Yōkai sācasu ga yattekita! No maki)
30	Baki Revives!! Haki, fukkatsu!! No maki (バキ、復活！！の巻)	June 8, 1999	978-4-08-872722-6
257. "Yōkai Girls' High School" (妖怪女子高の巻, Yōkai joshikō no maki); 258. "The Legendary Kudagitsune" (伝説のくだ狐の巻, Densetsu no Kuda-gitsune no maki); 259. "Special Training! Izuna and Gedo" (特訓! いずなとゲドの巻, Tokkun! Izuna to Gedo no maki); 260. "An Itako's Pride!" (イタコのプライド! の巻, Itako no pride! No maki); 261. "True Wealth" (真の富の巻, Shin no tomi no maki); 262. "Baki Revives!!" (覇鬼、復活!! の巻, Haki, fukkatsu!! No maki); 263. "Baki Goes on a Rampage!!" (覇鬼、大暴れ!! の巻, Haki, ōabare!! No maki); 264. "Operation: Defeat Baki!" (覇鬼打倒作戦! の巻, Haki datō sakusen! No maki); 265. "Which One Is My Big Brother!?" (お兄ちゃんはどっち!? の巻, Oniichan wa docchi!? No maki); 266. "At the End of the Battle..." (戦いの果てに...の巻, Tatakai no hate ni... no maki)
31	Sayonara Nūbē; Saishū-wa sayōnara Nūbē no maki (さよならぬ～べ～の巻)	September 3, 1999	978-4-08-872757-8
267. "Farewell" (別れの巻, Wakare no maki); 268. "The Unsent Sakura (Part 1)" (送らずの桜の巻 (その1), Okurazu no sakura no maki (sono 1)); 269. "The Unsent Sakura (Part 2)" (送らずの桜の巻 (その2), Okurazu no sakura no maki (sono 2)); 270. "The Unsent Sakura (Part 3)" (送らずの桜の巻 (その3), Okurazu no sakura no maki (sono 3)); 271. "Great Proposal Operation!!" (プロポーズ大作戦!! の巻, Puropōzu dai sakusen!! No maki); 272. "The Night Before Nūbē's Wedding" (ぬ～べ～結婚前夜の巻, Nūbē kekkon zenya no maki); 273. "For The Tears You've Wept!" (君が流した涙のために! の巻, Kimi ga nagashita namida no tame ni! No maki); 274. "Look! This is Love's Final Form!!" (見よ! これが愛の最終形態!! の巻, Miyo! Kore ga ai no saishū keitai!! No maki); 275. "The Graduation From Nūbē" (ぬ～べ～からの卒業の巻, Nūbē kara no sotsugyō no maki); 276. Finale: "Sayonara Nūbē" (最終話 さようならぬ～べ～の巻, Saishū-wa sayōnara Nūbē no maki); Special (1): "Nūbē Historical Chronology"; Special (2): "After Jigoku Sensei Nūbē" (それからの地獄先生ぬ～べ～, Sore kara no jigoku sensei Nube)

=== Jigoku Sensei Nūbē Neo ===
No.	Japanese release date	Japanese ISBN
1	October 3, 2014	978-4-08-880256-5
1. "Revived School Ghost Stories" (甦る学校怪談, Yomigaeru gakkō kaidan); 2. "The School's Hidden Website" (学校裏サイト, Gakkō ura saito); 3. "Child Poverty" (児童貧困, Jidō hinkon); 4. "Monster Parents" (モンスターペアレント, Monsutā perento); 5. "The Forbidden Game of Tag" (禁忌鬼ごっこ, Kinki onigokko); 6. "Troubled Students" (悩める生徒たち, Nayameru seito-tachi)
2	January 5, 2015	978-4-08-880302-9
7. "I'm Just a Kid!" (子供だもん!, Kodomo da mon!); 8. "Yuria Goes Berserk!" (ユリア、暴走!, Yuria, bōsō!); 9. "Satoe's Inner Conflict" (郷子の葛藤, Satoe no kattō); 10. "I Love Games" (ゲーム大好き, Gēmu daisuki); 11. "The Secret of the Demon Hand NEO, Part 1" (鬼の手の秘密NEO その1, Oni no te no himitsu NEO sono 1); 12. "The Secret of the Demon Hand NEO, Part 2" (鬼の手の秘密NEO その2, Oni no te no himitsu NEO sono 2); 13. "The Secret of the Demon Hand NEO, Part 3" (鬼の手の秘密NEO その3, Oni no te no himitsu NEO sono 3)
3	May 1, 2015	978-4-08-880362-3
14. "The Warrior's Return" (戦士の帰還, Senshi no kikan); 15. "Kent the Junker" (ジャンクなケント, Janku na kento); 16. "The Yōkai Sunekosuri" (妖怪すねこすり, Yōkai sunekosuri); 17. "The Thunder Father" (カミナリおやじ, Kaminari oyaji); 18. "That's Not Allowed! Nube-sensei" (いけない!ぬ～べ～先生, Ikenai! Nūbē sensei); 19. "The Return of "A", Part 1" (A"再来 その1, "A" sairai sono 1); 20. "The Return of "A", Part 2" (A"再来 その2, "A" sairai sono 2)
4	October 3, 2015	978-4-08-880554-2
21. "The Mysterious Transfer Student" (謎の転校生, Nazo no tenkōsei); 22. "Operation: Love Standby" (恋の待ち受け大作戦, Koi no machiuke daisakusen); 23. "I've Failed" (ボクは挫折したのだ, Boku wa zasetsu shita no da); 24. "Satoe, the Girl" (少女・郷子, Shōjo • Satoe); 25. "Boundary-Breaking Magic" (境壊法術, Kyōkai hōjutsu); 26. "There's a Hidden Side to "Omotenashi"" (「おもてなし」には裏がある, "Omotenashi" ni wa ura ga aru); 27. "The Abacus Boy" (算盤小僧, Samban kozō)
5	December 4, 2015	978-4-08-880558-0
28. "Two Heartbroken Souls" (せつない2人, Setsunai futari); 29. "A Sorrowful Farewell" (悲しき別れ, Kanashiki wakare); 30. "All Kinds of Yōkai" (妖怪どうもこうも, Yōkai dōmo kōmo); 31. "Makoto, the Boss Kid!" (ガキ大将まこと!, Gaki taishō Makoto!); 32. "A Faint Shadow" (薄い影, Usui kage); 33. "The Striking Dream" (たたき夢, Tataki yume); 34. "The Secret of the Hour of the Ox" (丑光の秘密, Ushimitsu no himitsu)
6	May 2, 2016	978-4-08-880697-6
35. "The Eye in the Butt" (尻の目, Shiri no me); 36. "Amabie vs. Artist Satoe" (アマビエvs.郷子画伯, Amabie vs. Satoe gahaku); 37. "Riding the Cold Wave" (寒波に乗って, Kanpa ni notte); 38. "The Midnight Classmate, Part 1" (真夜中の同級生 その1, Mayonaka no dōkyūsei sono 1); 39. "The Midnight Classmate, Part 2" (真夜中の同級生 その2, Mayonaka no dōkyūsei sono 2); 40. "Yuria vs. Tomabetchi" (ユリア対トマベッチ, Yuria tai tomabetchi); 41. "Illustrated Album for Sealing Tsukumogami" (付喪神封じ画帖, Tsukumogami fūji gachō)
7	August 4, 2016	978-4-08-880743-0
42. "A Small Love Story" (小さな恋のはずる, Chiisana koi no hazuru); 43. "Get Fired Up!!" (熱くなれ!!, Atsuku nare!!); 44. "The Technique of Tattowa" (タットワの技法, Tattowa no gihō); 45. "Big Sister Miki's Wonderful Spell" (美樹姉の素敵な呪文, Miki ane no suteki na jumon); 46. "The Shaken Town of Dōmori" (震撼の童守町, Shinkan no dōmamachi); 47. "Psychic Battle!" (霊能力者バトル!, Reinōryokusha batoru!); 48. "Karura" (カルラ, Karura)
8	December 2, 2016	978-4-08-880871-0
49. "Vimuku" (ヴィムク, Vimu-ku); 50. "Kurabokko" (倉ぼっこ, Kurabokko); 51. "This Man" (This man); 52. "Deceived by the Katsura Man" (桂男にだまされて, Katsura otoko ni damasarete); 53. "Whose Child Is That!?" (あの子だれの子!?, Ano ko dare no ko!?); 54. "And Then He Becomes a Father!?" (そして父になる!?, Soshite chichi ni naru!?); 55. "The Tears of Tofu Boy" (豆腐小僧の涙, Tōfu kozō no namida); Extra. "The Mystery of the Faceless Ghost" (のっぺらぼうの怪, Nopperabō no kai)
9	April 4, 2017	978-4-08-881101-7
56. "The Folding Screen Peeker" (屏風のぞき, Byōbu nozoki); 57. "The Substitute Cat" (身代わり猫, Migawari neko); 58. "Kento Transfers Schools" (ケント、転校, Kento, tenkō); 59. "The Human-Faced Tree" (人面樹, Jinmenju); 60. "The Famous Physician Hua Tuo" (名医華佗, Meii Kato); 61. "The Absurd Dōmori Battle Royale" (童守バカしあい合戦ボンボコ, Dōmori baka shiai gassen bonboko); 62. "Man from Hell" (地獄人, Jigokujin)
10	May 2, 2017	978-4-08-881102-4
63. "The Secret of the Hour of the Ox II" (丑光の秘密Ⅱ, Ushimitsu no himitsu II); 64. "The True Power of "N"" (「N」の実力, "N" no jitsuryoku); 65. "Nube Goes Astray" (ぬ～べ～迷走する, Nube meiso suru); 66. "The Hand of the Kosode" (小袖の手, Kosode no te); 67. "Let's Play with Yukibe!" (ゆきベ～と遊ぼう!, Yukibe~ to asobō!); 68. "Love and Sincerity" (愛とまこと, Ai to makoto); 69. "The Terrifying Ms. Abiko" (恐怖のあび子さん, Kyōfu no Abiko-san)
11	August 4, 2017	978-4-08-881232-8
70. "Be a Man, Kaneda!" (男だ! 金田, Otoko da! Kaneda); 71. "Joint Battle" (共闘, Kyōtō); 72. "The Switching Mirror" (すげかえ鏡, Sugekae kagami); 73. "Karura's Resurrection" (カルラ復活, Karura fukkatsu); 74. "Heaven's Judgment" (天の裁き, Ten no sabaki); 75. "Pay-to-Play Friends" (課金フレンズ, Kakin furenzu); 76. "Nanjamonja" (なんじゃもんじゃ, Nanjamonja)
12	November 2, 2017	978-4-08-881235-9
77. "Astral Projection Is Fun" (幽体離脱は楽しいな, Yūtai ridatsu wa tanoshii na); 78. "Outbreak in Dōmori" (童守町アウトブレイク, Dōmori-chō autobureiku); 79. "The Ame-onna's Love" (雨女の恋, Ame-onna no koi); 80. "The Genius Akira Returns!" (晶天才再び!, Akira tensai futatabi!); 81. "Nightmare Jaki" (悪夢のジャキー, Akumu no Jakī); 82. "Karura's Anguish" (カルラの苦悩, Karura no kunō); 83. "Ushioni and Isonna" (牛鬼と磯娘, Ushioni to Isonna); Extra. "The Secret of the Demon Hand" (鬼の手のヒ・ミ・ツ, Oni no te no himitsu)
13	January 4, 2018	978-4-08-881445-2
84. "When It Goes "Jan!"... " (ジャン!と鳴れば..., Jan! to nareba...); 85. "The White-Powder Hag" (白粉ババア, Oshiroi babā); 86. "Karura and Yukime" (カルラとゆきめ, Karura to Yukime); 87. "The Demon's Child" (悪魔の子, Akuma no ko); 88. "The Phantom Train" (偽汽車, Nise kisha); 89. "Hiroshi's Triumphant Return!! Part 1" (広、凱旋!! その1, Hiroshi, gaisen!! Sono 1); 90. "Hiroshi's Triumphant Return!! Part 2" (広、凱旋!! その2, Hiroshi, gaisen!! Sono 2)
14	April 4, 2018	978-4-08-881460-5
91. "Hiroshi's Triumphant Return!! Part 3" (広、凱旋!! その3, Hiroshi, gaisen!! Sono 3); 92. "Hiroshi's Triumphant Return!! Part 4" (広、凱旋!! その4, Hiroshi, gaisen!! Sono 4); 93. "A New Family" (新しい家族, Atarashii kazoku); 94. "Yukime, Karura, and Nube!" (ゆきめとカルラとぬ～べ～と!, Yukime to Karura to Nūbē to!); 95. "The Deadly Battle at Dōmori Arena!" (童守アリーナの死闘!, Dōmori arēna no shitō!); 96. "The Nanahiro Woman" (七尋女, Nanahiro onna); 97. "Yōkai's Child vs. Demon's Child!" (妖怪の子VS悪魔の子!, Yōkai no ko VS akuma no ko!)
15	July 4, 2018	978-4-08-881533-6
98. "At the Bottom of the Swamp..." (沼の底には..., Numa no soko ni wa...); 99. "The Tragedy of the Future Family" (未来一家の悲劇, Mirai ikka no higeki); 100. "Monster Children" (モンスターチルドレン, Monsutā Chirudoren); 101. "The Iron Woman" (鉄の女, Tetsu no onna); 102. "Kinjiro's Counterattack" (逆襲の金次郎, Gyakushū no Kinjirō); 103. "Countdown" (カウントダウン, Kauntodaun); 104. "The Descent of the Heavenly Demon Emperor!?" (鬼天帝降臨!?, Ki tentei kōrin!?)
16	October 4, 2018	978-4-08-881597-8
105. "A Message from Hell" (地獄からの伝言, Jigoku kara no dengon); 106. "Nube Put to the Test" (推し測られるぬ～べ～, Oshihakara reru Nūbē); 107. "Mothman" (モスマン, Mosuman); 108. "The Great Battle of Dōmori, Part 1" (童守町は大乱戦 前編, Dōmori-chō wa dairansen zenpen); 109. "The Great Battle of Dōmori, Part 2" (童守町は大乱戦 後編, Dōmori-chō wa dairansen kōhen); 110. "Makoto Slips!" (まこと、すべる!, Makoto, suberu!); 111. "The Unstoppable Evening Bell" (止められない晩鐘, Tomerarenai banshō)
17	January 4, 2019	978-4-08-881710-1
112. "The Great Descent Festival!" (大降臨祭!, Daikōrinsai!); 113. "Counterattack!" (反撃!, Hangeki!); 114. "The True Enemy" (真の敵, Shin no teki); 115. "The Heavenly Demon Emperor Lamia" (鬼天帝・ラミア, Ki tentei Ramiya); 116. "Full Armor" (フルアーマー, Furu Āmā); 117. "The Final Trump Card" (最後の切り札, Saigo no kirifuda); Epilogue. And Then Came Peaceful Days (そして平和な日々に, Soshite heiwa na hibi ni); After Jigoku Sensei Nube NEO (それからの地獄先生ぬ～べ～NEO, Sorekara no Jigoku sensei Nūbē NEO)

=== Jigoku Sensei Nūbē S ===
No.	Japanese release date	Japanese ISBN
1	March 4, 2019	978-4-08-881778-1
Prologue (プロローグ, Purorōgu); 1. The Curse of Ereko (呪いのエレ子さん, Noroi no Erekosan); 2. Urban Legend: The Mystery of Korokoro (都市伝説・コロコロの怪, Toshi densetsu: Korokoro no kai); 3. Virtua (バーチャ, Bācha); 4. The Togatsume Box (トガツメ箱, Togatsume bako); 5. The Gap Woman (すきま女, Sukima onna); Extra. A Grand Introduction to Spiritual Items! (霊能力アイテム大紹介!, Reinōryoku aitemu dai shōkai!)
2	January 4, 2020	978-4-08-882197-9
6. Signal (シグナル, Shigunaru); 7. The Legendary YouTuber (伝説のユーチューバー, Densetsu no Yūchūbā); 8. Slug Teacher (なめくじ先生, Namekuji sensei); 9. Uzuko the Slider (スライダーのうず子さん, Suraidā no Uzuko-san); 10. The Cursed Contact Lenses (呪いのカラコン, Noroi no karakon); Extra. Spirits Come in All Kinds!? (霊もいろいろ!?, Rei mo iroiro!?)
3	December 4, 2020	978-4-08-882508-3
11. Paranoia (疑心暗鬼, Gishin anki); 12. The Bonfire Man (焚火男, Takibi otoko); 13. Bloody Mary (ブラッディ・メアリー, Buraddi Mearī); 14. Shadow People (シャドーピープル, Shadō Pīpuru); 15. Skin Book (スキンブック, Sukin Bukku); Extra. Bad End...? (バッドエンド...?, Baddo Endo...?)
4	June 4, 2021	978-4-08-882752-0
16. Chichin Puipui (ちんちんぷいぷい, Chinchin puipui); 17. Press the Button (ボタンを押して, Botan o oshite); 18. Squishy (ぐにゃぐにゃ, Gunya gunya); 19. Mozuchi (モズチ, Mozuchi); Epilogue. The Eighth Loa (八番目のロア, Hachibanme no Roa)

=== Jigoku Sensei Nūbē Kai ===
No.	Japanese release date	Japanese ISBN
1	September 4, 2025	978-4-08-884616-3
Prologue. Records of One Hundred Tales (百物語見聞録, Hyakumonogatari kenbunroku); 1. Time Travel Once Again (タイムトラベル再び, Taimu toraberu futatabi); 2. The Kappa's Tribute (河童の年貢, Kappa no nengu); 3. The Cursed Hiraga Gennai (呪われた平賀源内, Norowareta Hiraga Gennai)
2	February 4, 2026	978-4-08-884843-3
4. Leave It and Go (おいてけ堀, Oitekebori); 5. Rokurokubi (ろくろ首, Rokurokubi); 6. Shuten-dōji (酒呑童子, Shuten dōji); 7. The Utsuro-bune (虚ろ舟, Utsurobune); 8. The Traditional Yuki-onna (伝承の雪女, Denshō no yuki-onna)
3	July 3, 2026	978-4-08-885098-6

=== Jigoku Sensei Nūbē Plus ===
No.	Japanese release date	Japanese ISBN
1	July 4, 2025	978-4-08-884579-1
1. Metsusankawa (滅三川の巻, Metsusankawa no maki); 2. The Twin Oni's Jump Rope (双子小鬼のなわとびの巻, Futago kooni no nawatori no maki); 3. The Nightmare Image-Generating AI (悪夢の画像生成AIの巻, Akumu no gazō seisei aI no maki); 4. Yukime, the Fated Person (ゆきめ、運命の人の巻, Yukime, unmei no hito no maki); 5. The Lightning Hag (ライトニングババアの巻, Raitoningu babaa no maki); 6. The Overly Intelligent Crow (頭の良すぎるカラスの巻, Atama no yosugiru karasu no maki); 7. Toward the Future (未来への巻, Mirai e no maki)

== Bunko volumes ==
In 2006, Shueisha released the entire series in new bunkoban volumes, filled with more chapters per volume than the original 31 volume run and new material by Takeshi Okano.

No.	Japanese release date	Japanese ISBN
1	January 18, 2006	978-4-08-618427-4
2	January 18, 2006	978-4-08-618428-1
3	March 17, 2006	978-4-08-618429-8
4	March 17, 2006	978-4-08-618430-4
5	April 18, 2006	978-4-08-618431-1
6	April 18, 2006	978-4-08-618432-8
7	May 18, 2006	978-4-08-618433-5
8	May 18, 2006	978-4-08-618434-2
9	June 16, 2006	978-4-08-618435-9
10	June 16, 2006	978-4-08-618436-6
11	July 14, 2006	978-4-08-618437-3
12	July 14, 2006	978-4-08-618438-0
13	August 10, 2006	978-4-08-618439-7
14	August 10, 2006	978-4-08-618440-3
15	September 15, 2006	978-4-08-618441-0
16	September 15, 2006	978-4-08-618442-7
17	October 18, 2006	978-4-08-618443-4
18	October 18, 2006	978-4-08-618444-1
19	November 17, 2006	978-4-08-618445-8
20	November 17, 2006	978-4-08-618446-5
