= Hiruzen =

Area of Maniwa, Japan

- 蒜山
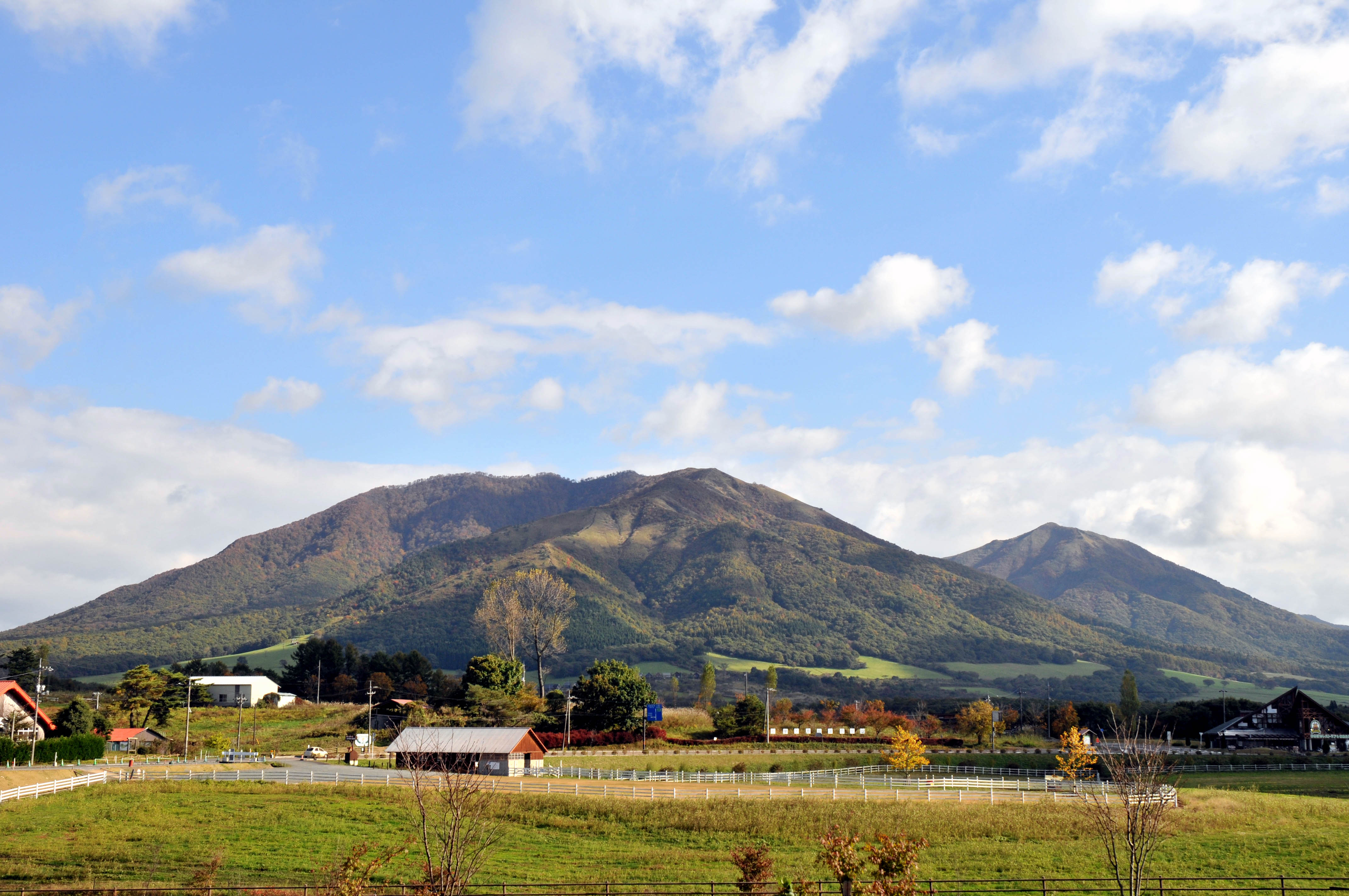
- Hiruzen viewed from the Hiruzen Plateau, with Kamihiruzen at center and Nakahiruzen to the right

Highest point
- Elevation: 1,202 m (3,944 ft)
- Coordinates: 35°19′30″N 133°39′49″E

Naming
- Language of name: Japanese
- Pronunciation: Japanese: [çiɾɯzeɴ]

Geography
- Location within Japan
- Location: Okayama Prefecture, Tottori Prefecture
- Parent range: Chūgoku Mountains

Climbing
- Easiest route: Hiking

Hiruzen (蒜山; ひるぜん) is the name of an area located in the north of Maniwa City in the north of Okayama Prefecture, Japan. Hiruzen was formed of 3 small towns: Chuka, Yatsuka, and Kawakami, which together were known as the town of Hiruzen, which was merged with several other towns to become current Maniwa City in 2005. Its main feature is the Hiruzen Sanza (蒜山三座), a mountain located on the border of Okayama and Tottori prefectures on the main island of Honshu in Japan. The Hiruzen Sanza consists of three peaks of similar elevation, the highest being Mt. Kamihiruzen (Hiruzen (上蒜山)) at 1,202 m (3,944 ft). The Hiruzen Highlands, (also known as the Hiruzen Plateau) has an elevation of 500 metres (0.31 mi) to 600 metres (0.37 mi). Hiruzen is an important part of the Daisen-Oki National Park.

== Etymology ==
The name of Hiruzen in the Japanese language is formed from two kanji characters, 蒜, meaning garlic, and 山, meaning "mountain".

== Peaks ==
The three peaks of Hiruzen are commonly known as the Hiruzen Sanza (蒜山三座), or the "three seats of Hiruzen". They run from west to east and include:

- Kamihiruzen (上蒜山), 1,202 metres (3,944 ft), translated as "upper Hiruzen"
- Nakahiruzen (中蒜山), 1,122 m (3,681 ft), or "central Hiruzen"
- Shimohiruzen (下蒜山), 1,101 m (3,612 ft), or "lower Hiruzen".

== History ==
Mount Hiruzen has been settled since the Japanese stone age. Remains from the Jōmon period (14,000–300 BCE) are scattered across the Hiruzen and Ōbagun Basins. The Yayoi period (300 BCE–250 CE) saw a great population increase to the area south of Hiruzen. The Hiruzen Basin is home to six kofun burial mound groups, each featuring a medium-size round kofun of approximately 10 to 30 meters. The kofun groups of the Hiruzen Basin date to the late 5th century. By the Kamakura period (1185–1333) the Hiruzen Basin had become the northernmost point of the domain of the Tokuyama clan. In the Sengoku period (1467–1573) the Hiruzen region was contested by the Yamana, Akamatsu, Miura and other clans. After the establishment of the Tokugawa shogunate in 1603, the area was ruled peacefully under direct control of the shogunate, the Mori clan, the Matsudaira clan, and others.

== Geography ==
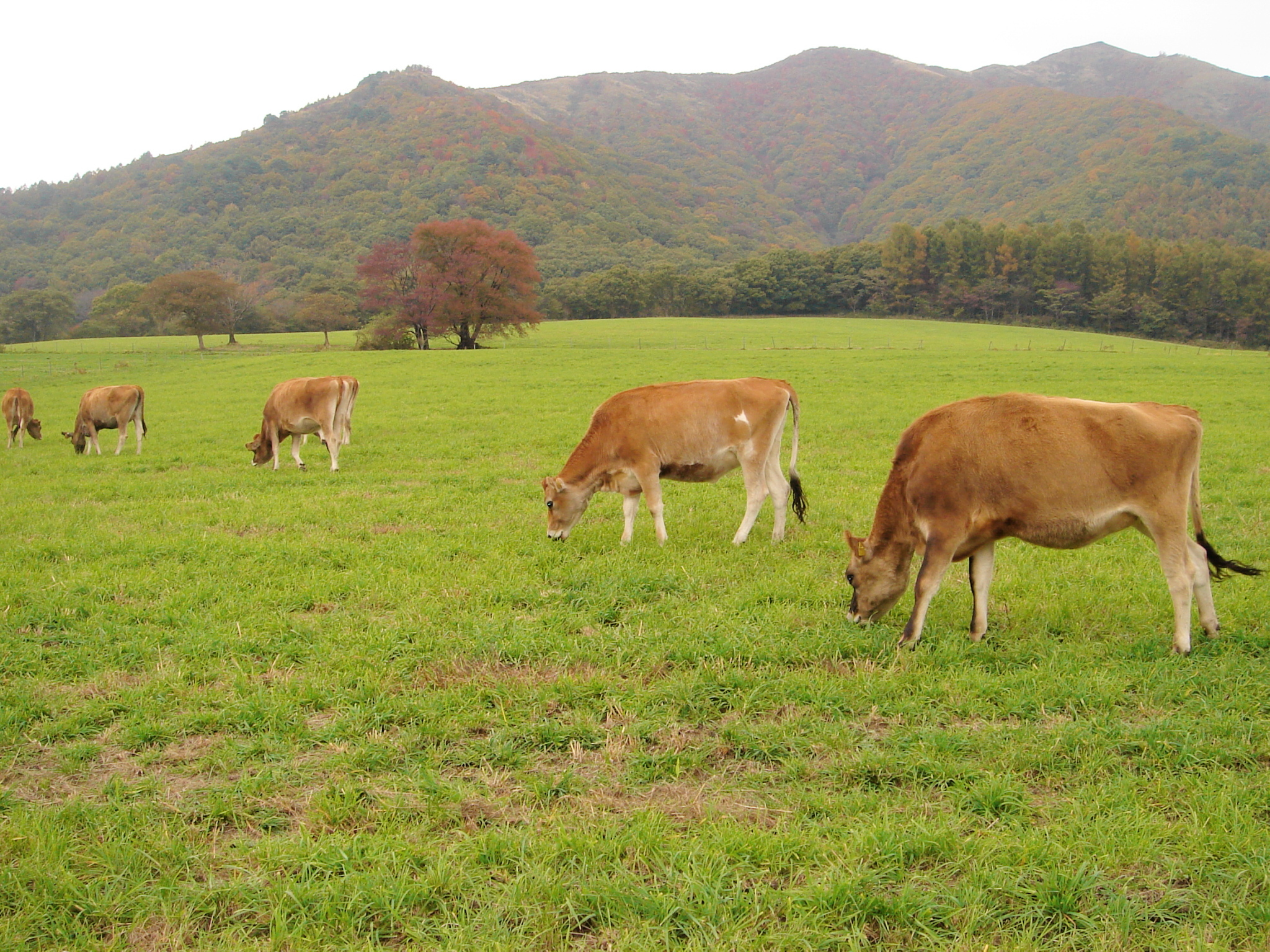
Jersey cattle on the Hiruzen Plateau

Hiruzen is a dormant, but not extinct, volcano located to the southeast of Mount Daisen. The three peaks of Hiruzen, along with a few smaller peaks, form the Hiruzen volcanic belt, a subset of the Daisen volcanic belt. An eruption of Daisen occurred approximately 350,000 years ago, and created a 200 hectares (490 acres) lake, known as Lake Hiruzenbara, above the Hiruzen Plateau. The lake supported an extensive population of diatoms for nearly 50,000 years, and Diatomaceous soil on the plain reaches 100 metres (330 ft) deep in some areas. Lake Hiruzenbara was gradually eroded on its eastern perimeter by the Asahi River, and dried up and disappeared over time.

=== Hiruzen Highlands ===
The Hiruzen Highlands, also known as the Hiruzen Plateau, known in Japanese as either the 蒜山高原 (Hiruzen Kōgen) or 蒜山原 (Hiruzen-bara), is located entirely in Maniwa City, Okayama Prefecture at the southern foot of Hiruzen. The plateau has an elevation of 500 metres (1,600 ft) to 600 metres (2,000 ft) and measures 20 kilometres (12 mi) east to west and 10 kilometres (6.2 mi) north to south. Known as a Resort area within west Japan, it receives the second highest number of tourists per year (25 million) within the prefecture after Kurashiki City (30 million). The plateau and its surrounding areas have been developed for recreation, specifically skiing and camping. Hiruzen Jersey Land, the largest Jersey cattle ranch in Japan, is also located on the plateau. Hiruzen Horse Park offers horseback riding on the plateau.

=== Asahi River ===
The Hiruzen Plateau is the source of the Asahi River, which flows 142 kilometres (88 mi) from Hiruzen south across the Okayama Plain, and empties into Kojima Bay on the Inland Sea in the eastern part of Okayama City. The Shiogama-reisen Cold Spring is designated as the source of the river, and is a protected natural habitat of the Japanese giant salamander. Yubara Dam, on the upper reaches of the Asahi, is approximately 12 kilometres (7.5 mi) from Hiruzen and was completed in 1952. The dam forms an artificial lake, Lake Yubara (455 hectares (1,120 acres)), directly to the southeast of the Hiruzen Plateau. The Hiruzen Plateau has also developed recreational facilities for camping, skiing, and fishing.

== Hiking ==
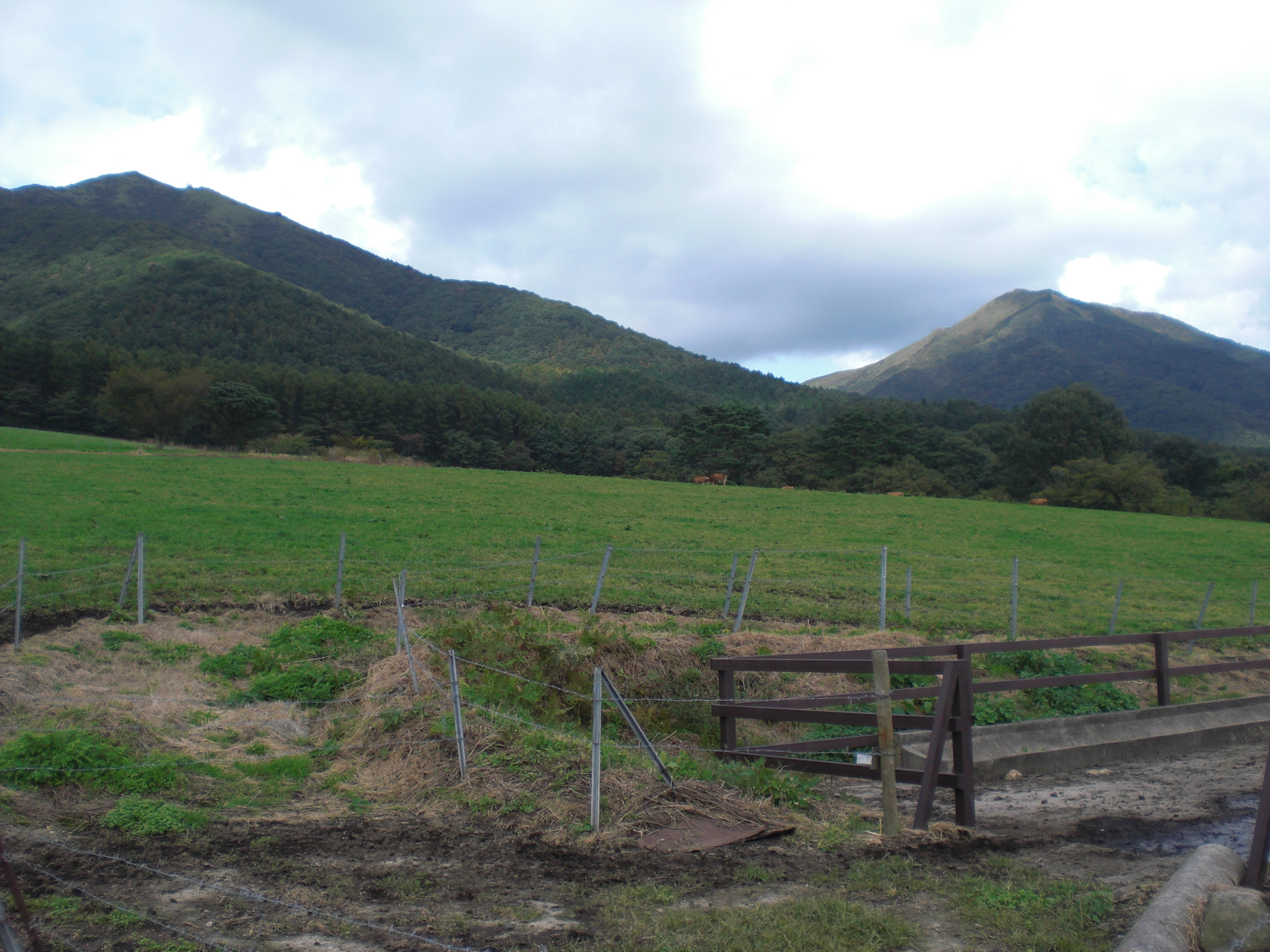
Mount Kamihiru

After Daisen, Hiruzen is the most visited mountain in the region, bordering on Tottori Prefecture. Hiruzen is a popular hiking destination. All three peaks are suitable for beginning climbers. The summit of Kamihiruzen and Nakahiruzen can be reached in approximately two hours, and Shimohiruzen in one hour and forty minutes, with a ridge trail leading across all three peaks taking roughly 10–12 hours from ascent to descent.

== Notable Places & Events ==
- Shiogama Reisen (Cold Spring)
- Hiruzen Herb Garden "Herbill"
  - With hundreds of species of flowers and herbs, this garden is most well known for its lavender, which blooms during the month of July, and English-style garden roses. Covered in snow during the Winter months, Herbill opens between April and December.
- Oomiya Obon Dance
  - Designated an Intangible Important Cultural Property, this dance has a long history spanning back hundreds of years. The dance takes place multiple times during August, at various Shrines throughout Hiruzen.
