= List of mergers in Okayama Prefecture =

Here is a list of mergers in Okayama Prefecture, Japan since the Heisei era.

== Mergers from April 1, 1999 to Present ==
- On October 1, 2004 - the old city of Takahashi absorbed the town of Ukan (from Jōbō District), and the towns of Bitchū, Kawakami and Nariwa (all from Kawakami District) to create the new and expanded city of Takahashi. Kawakami District was dissolved as a result of this merger.
- On October 1, 2004 - the town of Kamogawa (from Mitsu District), and the town of Kayō (from Jōbō District) were merged to create the town of Kibichūō. The new town belongs to the newly created Kaga District, founded upon this merger.
- On November 1, 2004 - the towns of Oku, Osafune and Ushimado (all from Oku District) were merged to create the city of Setouchi. Oku District was dissolved as a result of this merger.
- On February 28, 2005 - the town of Kamo, the village of Aba (both from Tomata District), the town of Kume (from Kume District), and the town of Shōboku (from Katsuta District) were merged into the expanded city of Tsuyama.
- On March 1, 2005 - the town of Yoshii (from Shitsuki District) and the town of Bisei (from Oda District) were merged into the expanded city of Ibara. Shitsuki District was dissolved as a result of this merger.
- On March 1, 2005 - the town of Okutsu, and the villages of Kamisaibara and Tomi (all from Tomata District) were merged into the expanded town of Kagamino.
- On March 7, 2005 - the towns of Akasaka, Kumayama, San'yō and Yoshii (all from Akaiwa District) were merged to create the city of Akaiwa.
- On March 22, 2005 - the town of Mitsu (from Mitsu District), and the town of Nadasaki (from Kojima District) were merged into the expanded city of Okayama. Kojima District was dissolved as a result of this merger.
- On March 22, 2005 - the old city of Sōja absorbed the villages of Kiyone and Yamate (both from Tsukubo District) to create the new and expanded city of Sōja.
- On March 22, 2005 - the old city of Bizen absorbed the towns of Hinase and Yoshinaga (both from Wake District) to create the new and expanded city of Bizen.
- On March 22, 2005 - the towns of Asahi, Chūō and Yanahara (all from Kume District) were merged to create the town of Misaki.
- On March 31, 2005 - the old city of Niimi absorbed the towns of Ōsa, Shingō, Tessei and Tetta (all from Atetsu District) to create the new and expanded city of Niimi. Atetsu District was dissolved as a result of this merger.
- On March 31, 2005 - the town of Hokubō (from Jōbō District), and towns of Katsuyama, Kuse, Ochiai and Yubara, and the villages of Chūka, Mikamo, Kawakami and Yatsuka (all from Maniwa District) were merged to create the city of Maniwa. Jōbō District was dissolved as a result of this merger.
- On March 31, 2005 - the former town of Mimasaka absorbed the towns of Aida, Ōhara and Sakutō, the village of Higashiawakura (all from Aida District), and the town of Katsuta (from Katsuta District) to create the city of Mimasaka.
- On August 1, 2005 - the town of Funao (from Asakuchi District), and the town of Mabi (from Kibi District) were merged into the expanded city of Kurashiki. Kibi District was dissolved as a result of this merger.
- On March 1, 2006 - the town of Saeki (from Wake District) were merged into the expanded town of Wake.
- On March 21, 2006 - the towns of Kamogata, Konkō and Yorishima (all from Asakuchi District) were merged to create the city of Asakuchi.
- On January 22, 2007 - the town of Seto (from Akaiwa District), and the town of Takebe (from Mitsu District) were merged into the expanded city of Okayama. Akaiwa District and Mitsu District were dissolved as a result of this merger.
