= Katsuyama, Okayama =

Katsuyama 勝山町
- Former municipality
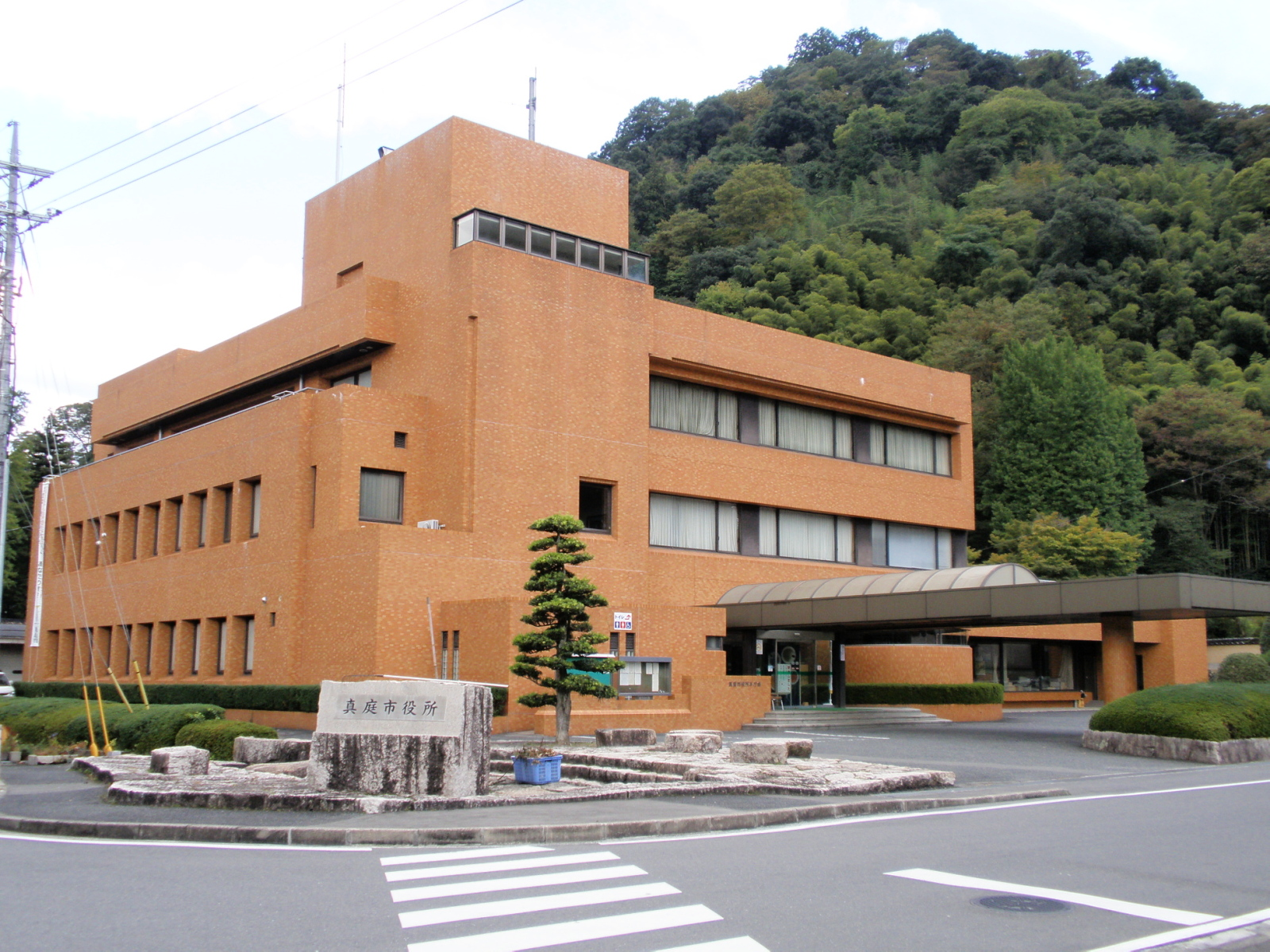
- Former Katsuyama town hall

- Location in Japan
- Coordinates: 35°5′15.4″N 133°41′28.8″E
- Country: Japan
- Region: Chūgoku
- Prefecture: Okayama Prefecture
- District: Maniwa
- Merged: March 31, 2005 (now part of Maniwa)

Area
  - Total: 138.79 km^{2} (53.59 sq mi)

Population (2003)
  - Total: 9,027
  - Density: 65.04/km^{2} (168.5/sq mi)
- Time zone: UTC+09:00 (JST)
- Symbols
- Flower: Osmanthus fragrans
- Tree: Chamaecyparis obtusa

Katsuyama (勝山町, Katsuyama-chō) was a town located in Maniwa District, Okayama Prefecture, Japan.

As of 2003, the town had an estimated population of 9,027 and a density of 65.04 persons per km^{2}. The total area was 138.79 km^{2}.

On March 31, 2005, Katsuyama, along with the town of Hokubō (from Jōbō District), and towns of Kuse, Ochiai and Yubara, and the villages of Chūka, Kawakami, Mikamo and Yatsuka (all from Maniwa District) were merged to create the city of Maniwa.

To coincide with the 2005 merger, Katsuyama residents were given a book commemorating the last 50 years of Katsuyama's existence as a town and a special purple cloth with the town logo imprinted on it.

Local to Katsuyama is the Kanba waterfall (神庭の滝, Kanba no taki), the only Okayama waterfall on the list of Japan's Top 100 Waterfalls and home to Japanese macaque monkeys.

Recently, Katsuyama has also become known for its noren adorning the shops and houses along a 1 km stretch of the Katsuyama Historical Preservation District, wherein the Edo Period landscape of the town remains.

== Traditional products ==
Katsuyama is famous for its bamboo basketry, originating from the town's Tsukida district, and four types of baskets produced there are designated as "Traditional Japanese Crafts".

Also famous is Gozenshu sake made by Katsuyama's Tsuji Honten brewery which has been in the town since the early 1800s, having relocated from nearby Ochiai.

== Geography ==
Rivers: Asahi River (The big-3 river through Okayama Prefecture).

Adjoining municipalities in Okayama Prefecture: Kuse, Ochiai, Yubara, Mikamo, Hokubō, and Ōsa.

== Education ==
- Katsuyama Elementary School
- Tsukida Elementary School
- Tomihara Elementary School
- Katsuyama Junior High School
- Okayama Prefectural Katsuyama High School

== Transportation ==
=== Railways ===
- West Japan Railway Company
  - Kishin Line
    - Chūgoku-Katsuyama Station – Tsukida Station – Tomihara Station

=== Road ===
- National highways:
  - Route 181
  - Route 313
- Prefectural roads:
  - Okayama Prefectural Route 32 (Niimi-Katsuyama)
  - Okayama Prefectural Route 84 (Katsuyama-Kurihara)
  - Okayama Prefectural Route 201 (Kanba waterfall)
  - Okayama Prefectural Route 311 (Akuchi-Kami)
  - Okayama Prefectural Route 320 (Wakashiro-Hōkoku Station)
  - Okayama Prefectural Route 321 (Kōjiro-Katsuyama)
  - Okayama Prefectural Route 390 (Komi-Tsukida Station)
  - Okayama Prefectural Route 459 (Wakashiro-Kōjiro)

== Notable places and events ==
- Katsuyama castle town
- Katsuyama Historical Preservation District
- Kanba waterfall
- Katsuyama Danjiri Festival (October 19–20)
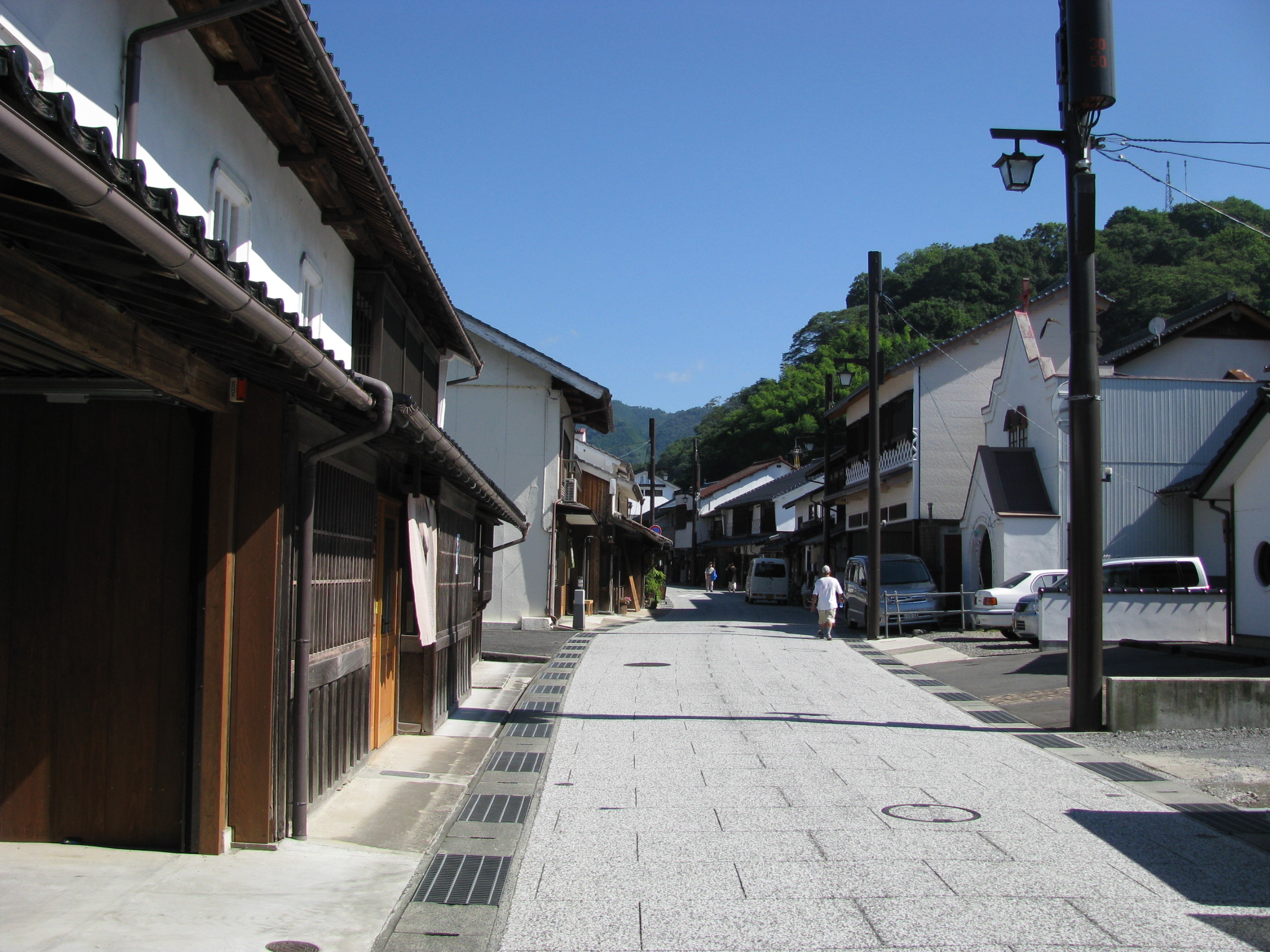
Katsuyama castle town

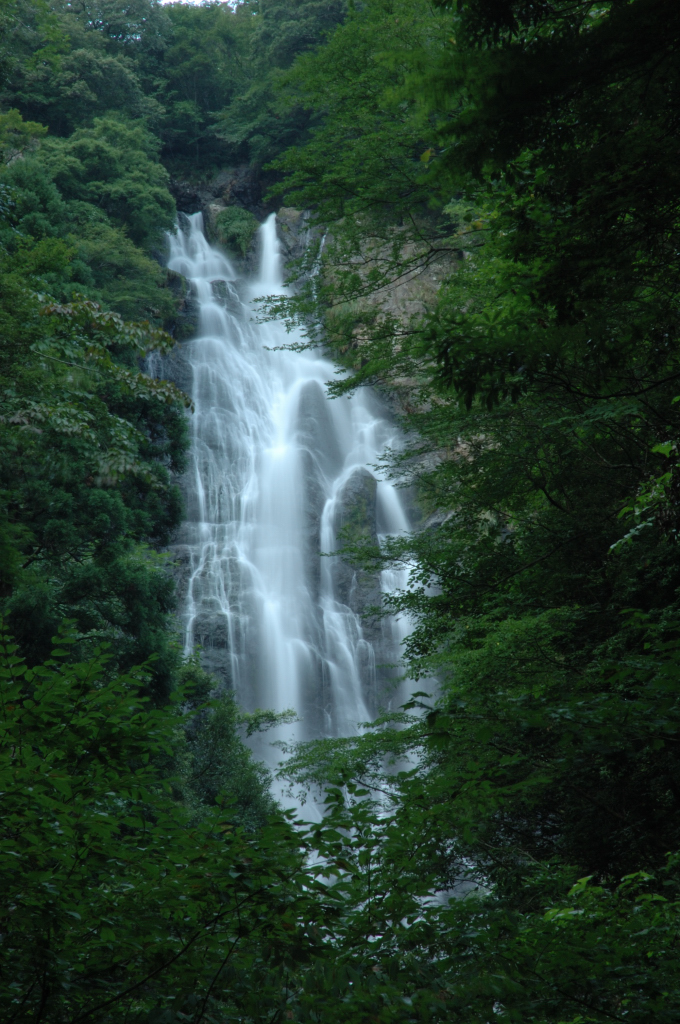
Kanba waterfall
