= Mikamo, Okayama =

Mikamo 美甘村
- Former municipality
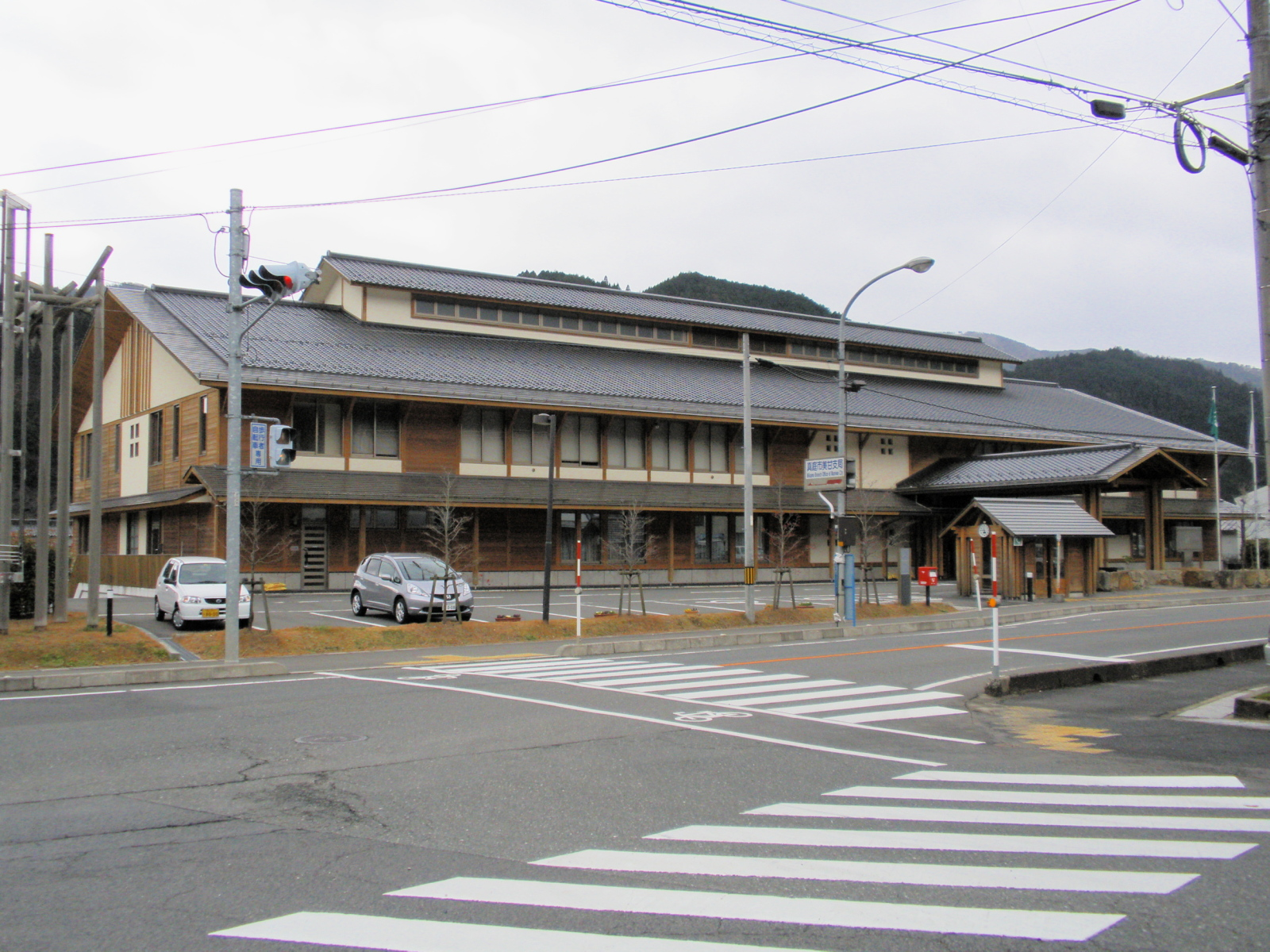
- Former Mikamo village hall

- Location in Japan
- Coordinates: 35°9′26.0″N 133°37′26.0″E
- Country: Japan
- Region: Chūgoku
- Prefecture: Okayama Prefecture
- District: Maniwa
- Merged: March 31, 2005 (now part of Maniwa)

Area
  - Total: 67.19 km^{2} (25.94 sq mi)

Population (2003)
  - Total: 1,668
  - Density: 24.83/km^{2} (64.3/sq mi)
- Time zone: UTC+09:00 (JST)
- Symbols
- Flower: Rhododendron; Narcissus
- Tree: Chamaecyparis obtusa

Mikamo (美甘村, Mikamo-son) was a town located in Maniwa District, Okayama Prefecture, Japan.

As of 2003, the village had an estimated population of 1,668 and a density of 24.83 persons per km^{2}. The total area was 67.19 km^{2}.

On March 31, 2005, Mikamo, along with the town of Hokubō (from Jōbō District), and towns of Katsuyama, Kuse, Ochiai and Yubara, and the villages of Chūka, Kawakami and Yatsuka (all from Maniwa District) were merged to create the city of Maniwa.

== Geography ==
- Rivers: Shinjō River (Tributary of the Asahi River)

=== Adjoining municipalities ===
- Okayama Prefecture
  - Katsuyama
  - Yubara
  - Shinjō
  - Ōsa

== Education ==
- Mikamo Elementary School
- Mikamo Junior High School

== Transportation ==
=== Road ===
- National highways:
  - Route 181
- Prefectural roads:
  - Okayama Prefectural Route 55 (Yubara-Mikamo)
  - Okayama Prefectural Route 447 (Awadani-Mikamo)
