= Ochiai, Okayama =

Ochiai 落合町
- Former municipality
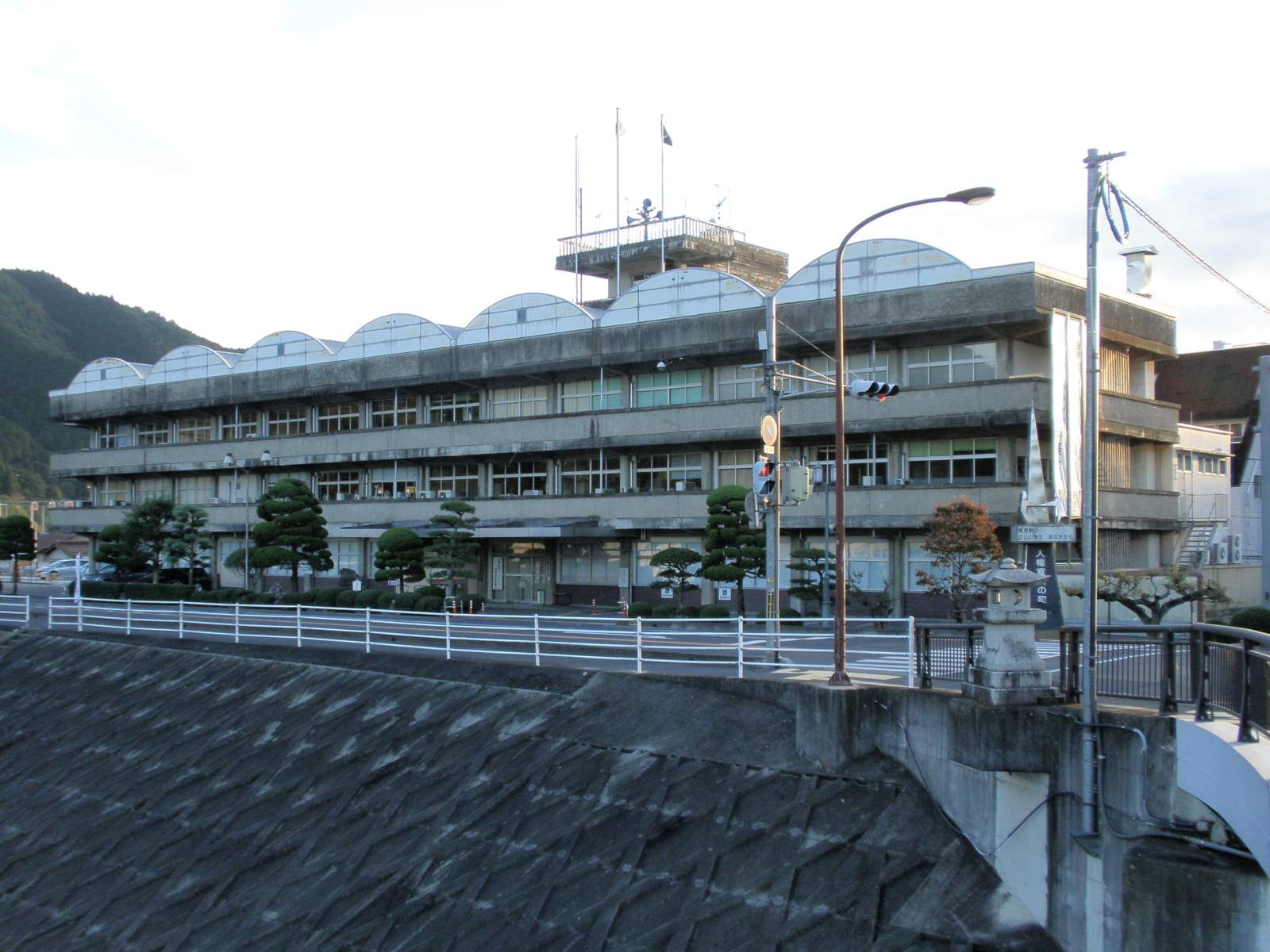
- Former Ochiai town hall

- Location in Japan
- Coordinates: 35°1′5″N 133°45′8.5″E
- Country: Japan
- Region: Chūgoku
- Prefecture: Okayama Prefecture
- District: Maniwa
- Merged: March 31, 2005 (now part of Maniwa)

Area
  - Total: 147.92 km^{2} (57.11 sq mi)

Population (2003)
  - Total: 15,652
  - Density: 105.81/km^{2} (274.0/sq mi)
- Time zone: UTC+09:00 (JST)
- Symbols
- Bird: Japanese bush-warbler
- Flower: Prunus mume
- Tree: Prunus mume

Ochiai (落合町, Ochiai-chō) was a town located in Maniwa District, Okayama Prefecture, Japan.

== Population ==
As of 2003, the town had an estimated population of 15,652 and a density of 105.81 persons per km^{2}. The total area was 147.92 km^{2}.

== Merge ==
On March 31, 2005, Ochiai, along with the town of Hokubō (from Jōbō District), and towns of Katsuyama, Kuse and Yubara, and the villages of Chūka, Kawakami, Mikamo and Yatsuka (all from Maniwa District) were merged to create the city of Maniwa.

== Geography ==
- Rivers: Asahi River (The big-3 river through Okayama Prefecture), Bicchū River (Tributary of the Asahi River)

=== Adjoining municipalities ===
- Okayama Prefecture
  - Katsuyama
  - Kuse
  - Hokubō
  - Takahashi (Former Ukan town)
  - Tsuyama (Former Kume town)
  - Misaki (Former Asahi town)
  - Kibichūō (Former Kamogawa town)

== Education ==
- Amatsu Elementary School
- Ueda Elementary School
  - Ueyama Branch School
- Ochiai Elementary School
- Kawahigashi Elementary School
- Kiyama Elementary School
  - Hinoue Branch School
- Kōchi Elementary School
- Tsuda Elementary School
- Bessho Elementary School
- Mikawa Elementary School
- Ochiai Junior High School
- Okayama Prefectural Ochiai High School

== Transportation ==
=== Railways ===
- West Japan Railway Company
  - Kishin Line
    - Mimasaka-Oiwake Station - Mimasaka-Ochiai Station - Komi Station

=== Road ===
- Expressways:
  - Chūgoku Expressway
    - Mimasaka-Oiwake Parking Area - Ochiai Junction - Ochiai Interchange - Maniwa Parking Area
  - Yonago Expressway
    - Ochiai Junction
- National highways:
  - Route 181
  - Route 313
- Prefectural roads:
  - Okayama Prefectural Route 30 (Ochiai-Takebe)
  - Okayama Prefectural Route 66 (Ochiai-Kamogawa)
  - Okayama Prefectural Route 84 (Katsuyama-Kurihara)
  - Okayama Prefectural Route 204 (Mimasaka-Ochiai Station)
  - Okayama Prefectural Route 329 (Nishibara-Kuse)
  - Okayama Prefectural Route 330 (Meki-Ōba)
  - Okayama Prefectural Route 332 (Kurihara-Ukan)
  - Okayama Prefectural Route 333 (Ueyama-Dando)
  - Okayama Prefectural Route 370 (Eyomi-Kamigōchi)
  - Okayama Prefectural Route 390 (Komi-Tsukida Station)
  - Okayama Prefectural Route 411 (Tarumi-Oiwake)
- Roadside Station
  - Daigo no Sato

== Notable places and events ==
- Daigo Cherry Tree (醍醐桜, Daigo Zakura)
  - A 1000+ year old cherry tree, named after the former Emperor Daigo, who commented upon the impressiveness of the tree when passing by on his way to exile in the Oki Islands.
