= Yubara, Okayama =

Yubara 湯原町
- Former municipality
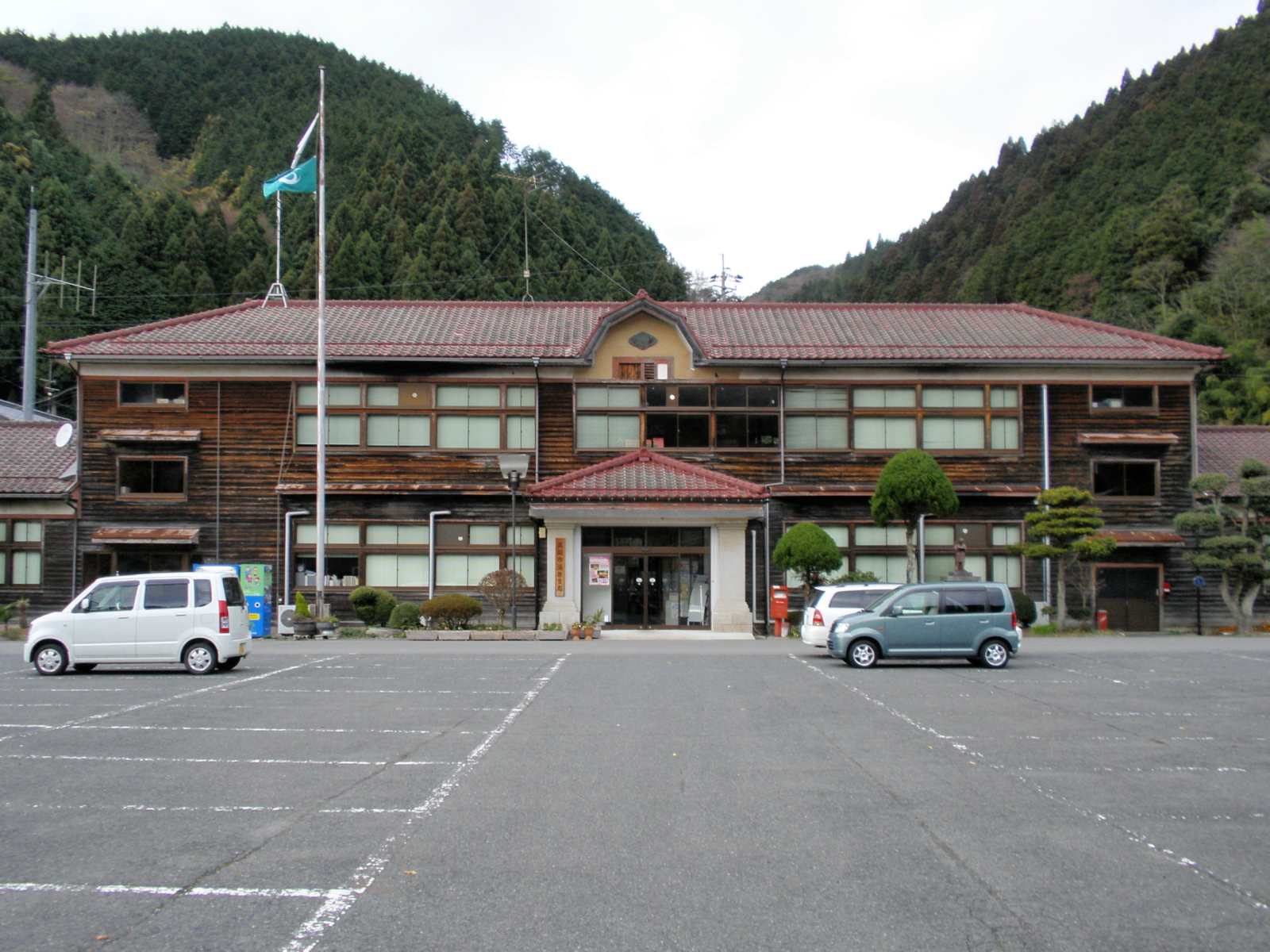
- Former Yubara town hall

- Location in Japan
- Coordinates: 35°11′41.9″N 133°43′52.9″E
- Country: Japan
- Region: Chūgoku
- Prefecture: Okayama Prefecture
- District: Maniwa
- Merged: March 31, 2005 (now part of Maniwa)

Area
  - Total: 141.37 km^{2} (54.58 sq mi)

Population (2003)
  - Total: 3,310
  - Density: 23.41/km^{2} (60.6/sq mi)
- Time zone: UTC+09:00 (JST)
- Symbols
- Bird: Japanese bush-warbler
- Flower: Prunus mume
- Tree: Cryptomeria

Yubara (湯原町, Yubara-chō) was a town located in Maniwa District, Okayama Prefecture, Japan.

As of 2003, the town had an estimated population of 3,310 and a density of 23.41 persons per km^{2}. The total area was 141.37 km^{2}.

On March 31, 2005, Yubara, along with the town of Hokubō (from Jōbō District), and towns of Katsuyama, Kuse and Ochiai, and the villages of Chūka, Kawakami, Mikamo and Yatsuka (all from Maniwa District) were merged to create the city of Maniwa.

The historic town is nestled in a ravine and follows the meandering path of the Asahi River. The village is surrounded, on all sides by trees clinging to the hillsides. (There are small logging operations in the region that the bus passes on the way into town.) The town sits at the base of Yubara Dam. There are a number onsen hotels. There is also an outdoor, mixed bathing bath, or rotenburo, by the river. This facility is free. The waters are said to have healing effects on those suffering from diabetes, chronic women's diseases, chronic skin disease, cuts and burns.

== Geography ==
- Rivers: Asahi River (The big-3 river through Okayama Prefecture)

=== Adjoining municipalities ===
- Okayama Prefecture
  - Katsuyama
  - Kuse
  - Mikamo
  - Kawakami
  - Yatsuka
  - Chūka
  - Shinjō
  - Kagamino (Former Tomi village)

== Education ==
- Yubara Elementary School
- Futakawa Elementary School
- Yubara Junior High School

== Transportation ==
- Expressways:
  - Yonago Expressway
    - Yubara Interchange
- National highways:
  - Route 313
- Prefectural roads:
  - Okayama Prefectural Route 55 (Yubara-Mikamo)
  - Okayama Prefectural Route 56 (Yubara-Okutsu)
  - Okayama Prefectural Route 322 (Nakafukuda-Yubara)
  - Okayama Prefectural Route 323 (Tanemi-Akedo)
  - Okayama Prefectural Route 326 (Kashinishi-Yubara)
  - Okayama Prefectural Route 447 (Awadani-Mikamo)

== Notable places and events ==
- Yubara Onsen
- Yubara Dam (Lake Yubara)
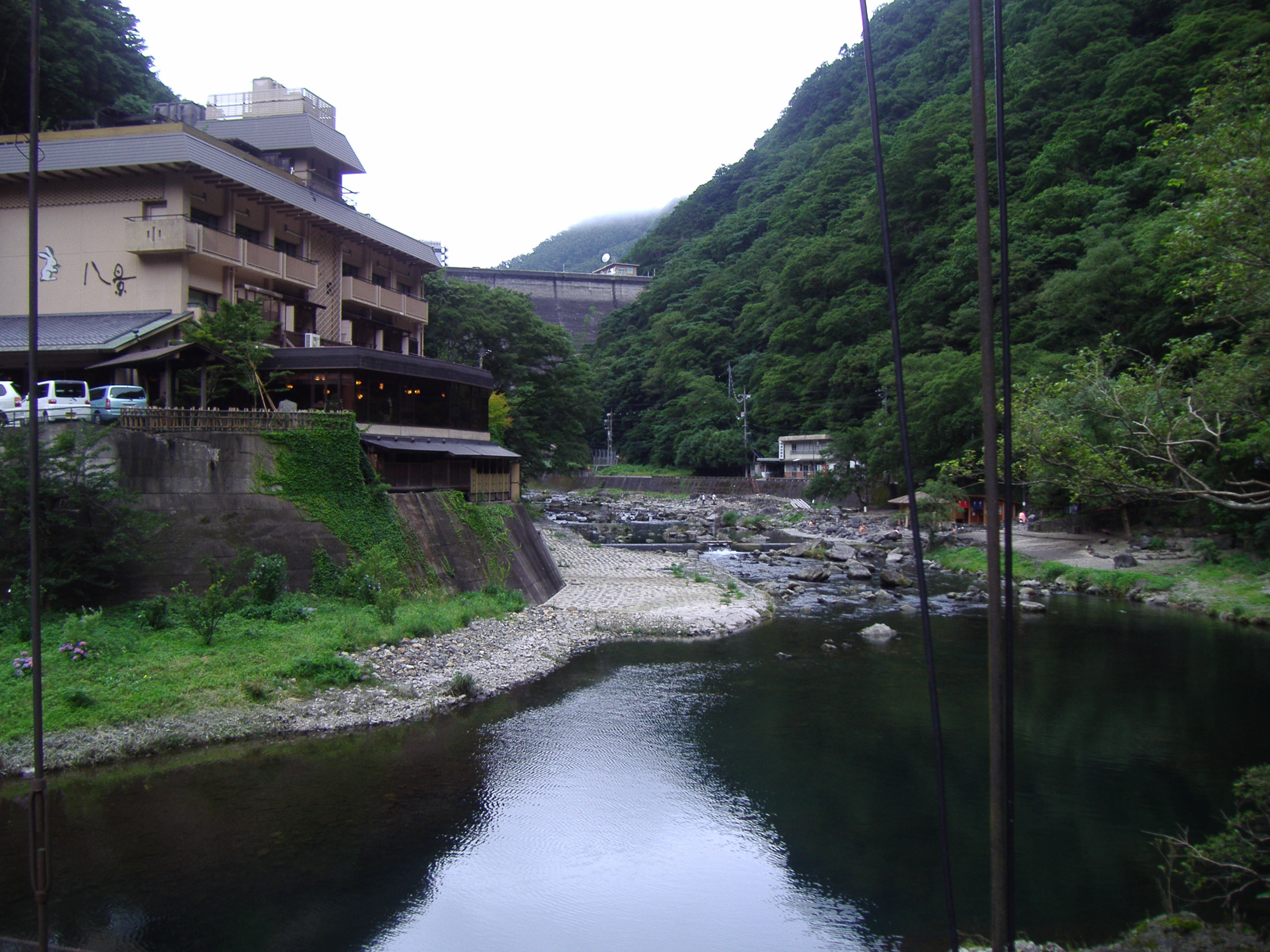
Open-air hot springs

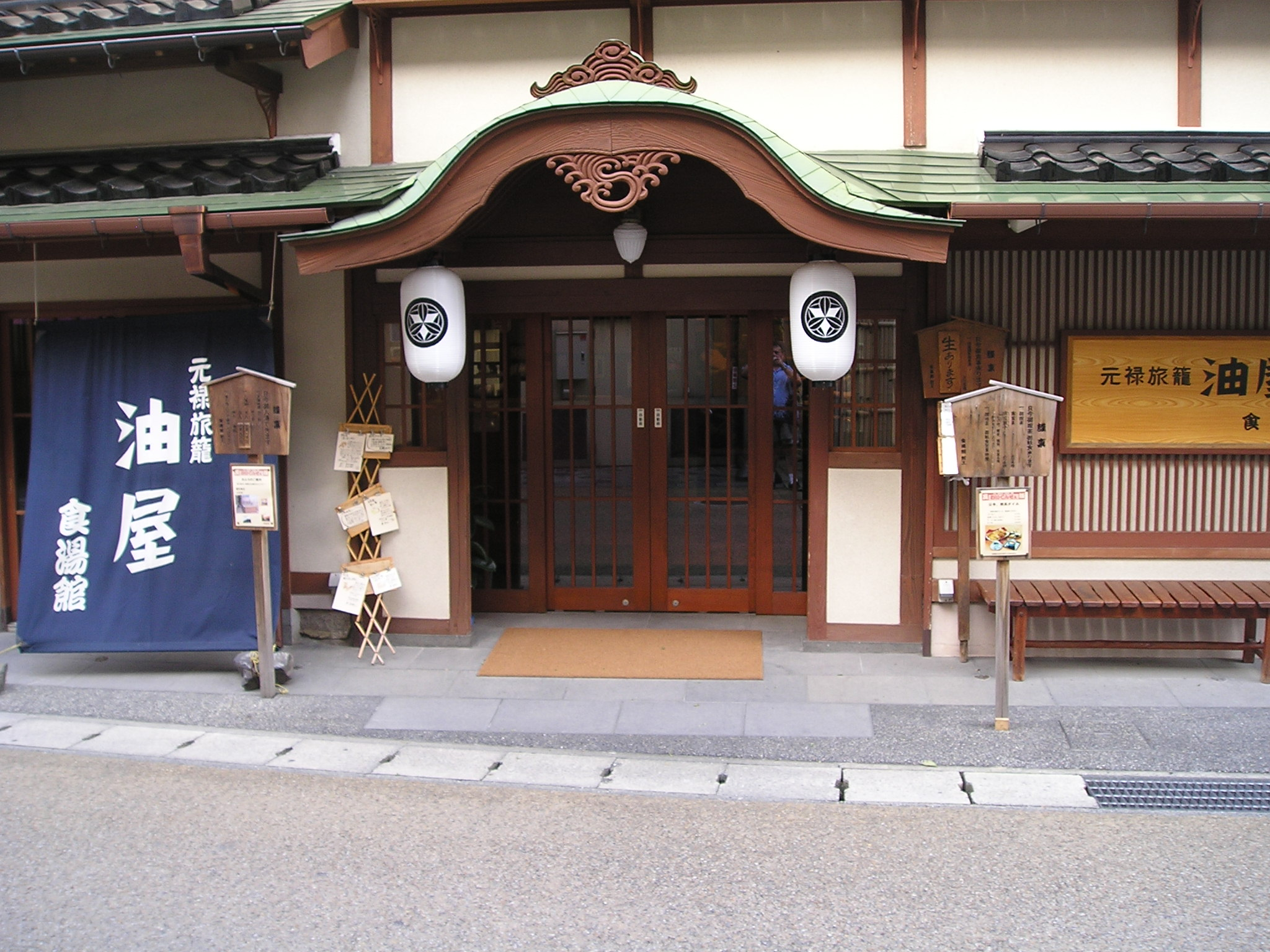
Onsen
