= Kawakami, Okayama (Maniwa) =

Kawakami 川上村
- Former municipality
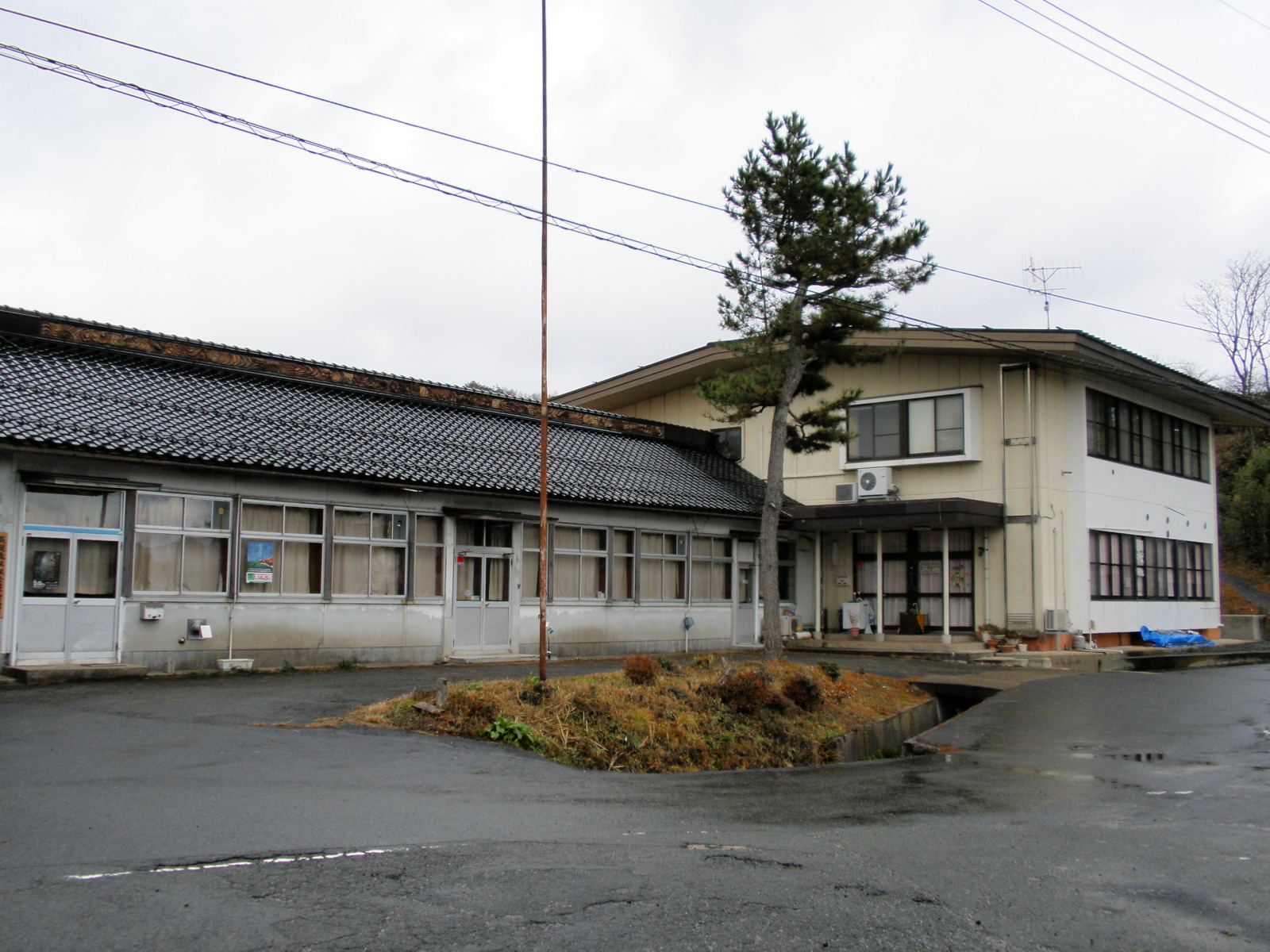
- Former Kawakami village hall

- Location in Japan
- Coordinates: 35°16′49.5″N 133°38′34.5″E
- Country: Japan
- Region: Chūgoku
- Prefecture: Okayama Prefecture
- District: Maniwa
- Merged: March 31, 2005 (now part of Maniwa)

Area
  - Total: 77.94 km^{2} (30.09 sq mi)

Population (2003)
  - Total: 2,372
  - Density: 30.43/km^{2} (78.8/sq mi)
- Time zone: UTC+09:00 (JST)
- Symbols
- Bird: Oriental dollarbird
- Flower: Rhododendron
- Tree: Aesculus

Kawakami (川上村, Kawakami-son) was a town located in Maniwa District, Okayama Prefecture, Japan.

As of 2003, the village had an estimated population of 2,372 and a density of 30.43 persons per km^{2}. The total area was 77.94 km^{2}.

On March 31, 2005, Kawakami, along with the town of Hokubō (from Jōbō District), and towns of Katsuyama, Kuse, Ochiai and Yubara, and the villages of Chūka, Mikamo and Yatsuka (all from Maniwa District) were merged to create the city of Maniwa.

== Geography ==
- Mountains: Mount Hiruzen (蒜山, Hiruzen)
- Rivers: Asahi River (The big-3 river through Okayama Prefecture)

=== Adjoining municipalities ===
- Okayama Prefecture
  - Yubara
  - Yatsuka
  - Shinjō
- Tottori Prefecture
  - Kōfu
  - Kurayoshi (Former Sekigane town)

== Education ==
- Kawakami Elementary School
- Hiruzen Junior High School (Yatsuka)

== Transportation ==
- Expressways:
  - Yonago Expressway
    - Hiruzen Kōgen Service Area - Hiruzen Interchange
- National highways:
  - Route 482
- Prefectural roads:
  - Okayama Prefectural Route 58 (Hokubō - Kawakami)
  - Okayama Prefectural Route 113 (Kamitokuyama-Matano-Kōfu)
  - Okayama Prefectural Route 114 (Daisen-Kamifukuda)
  - Okayama Prefectural Route 322 (Nakafukuda-Yubara)
  - Okayama Prefectural Route 324 (Higashikayabe-Shimofukuda)
  - Okayama Prefectural Route 422 (Hiruzen Kōgen)
  - Okayama Prefectural Route 702 (Yatsuka-Kawakami cycling road)
- Roadside Station
  - Windy House (風の家, Kaze no Ie)

== Notable places and events ==
- Mount Hiruzen
- Hiruzen plateau (蒜山高原, Hiruzen Kōgen)
- Hiruzen Kōgen Center / Joyful Park (Amusement park)
- Hiruzen Bear Valley Ski resort
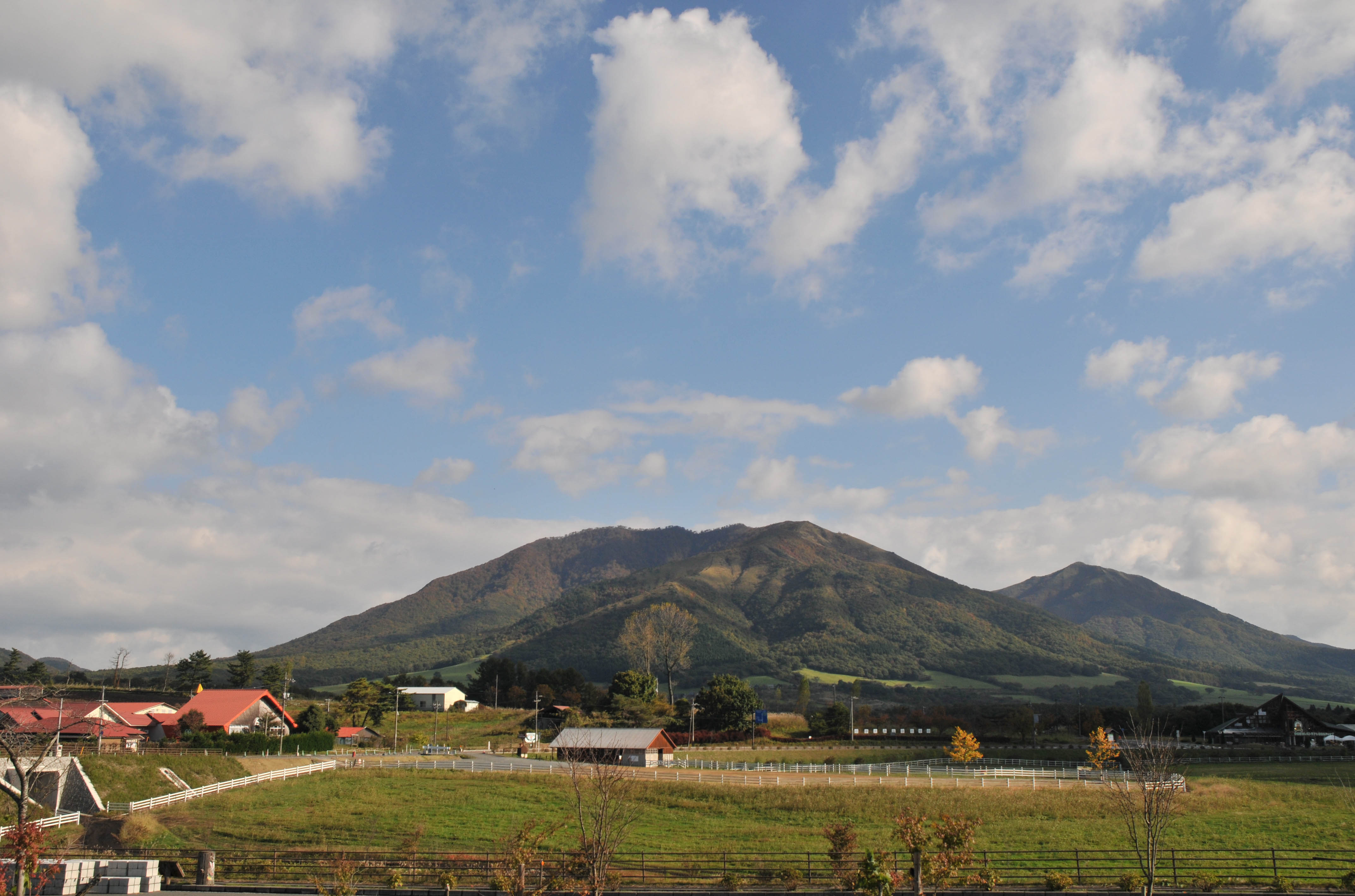
Hiruzen mountains and Hiruzen plateau

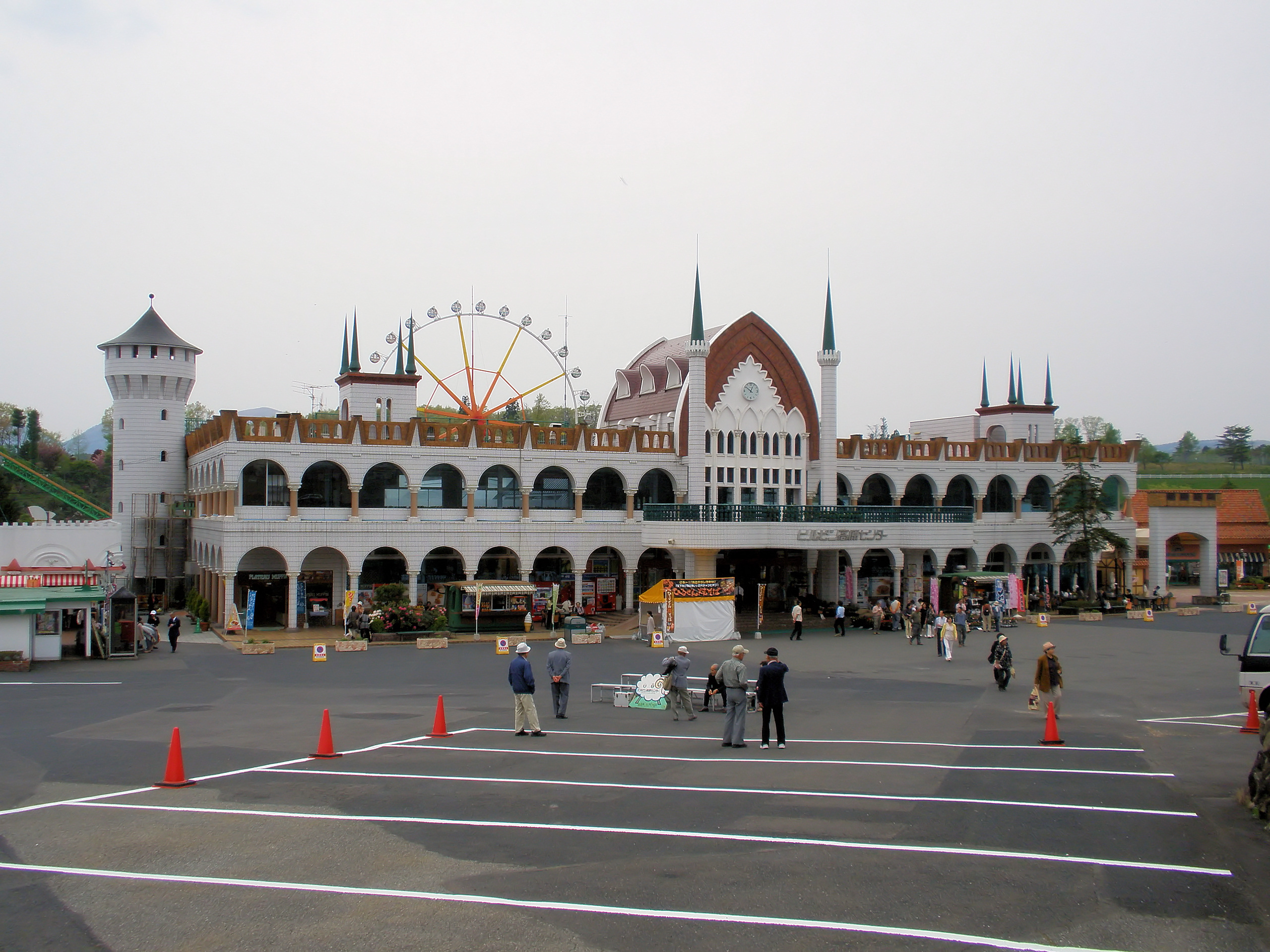
Hiruzen Kōgen Center
