= Maniwa =

Maniwa 真庭市
- City
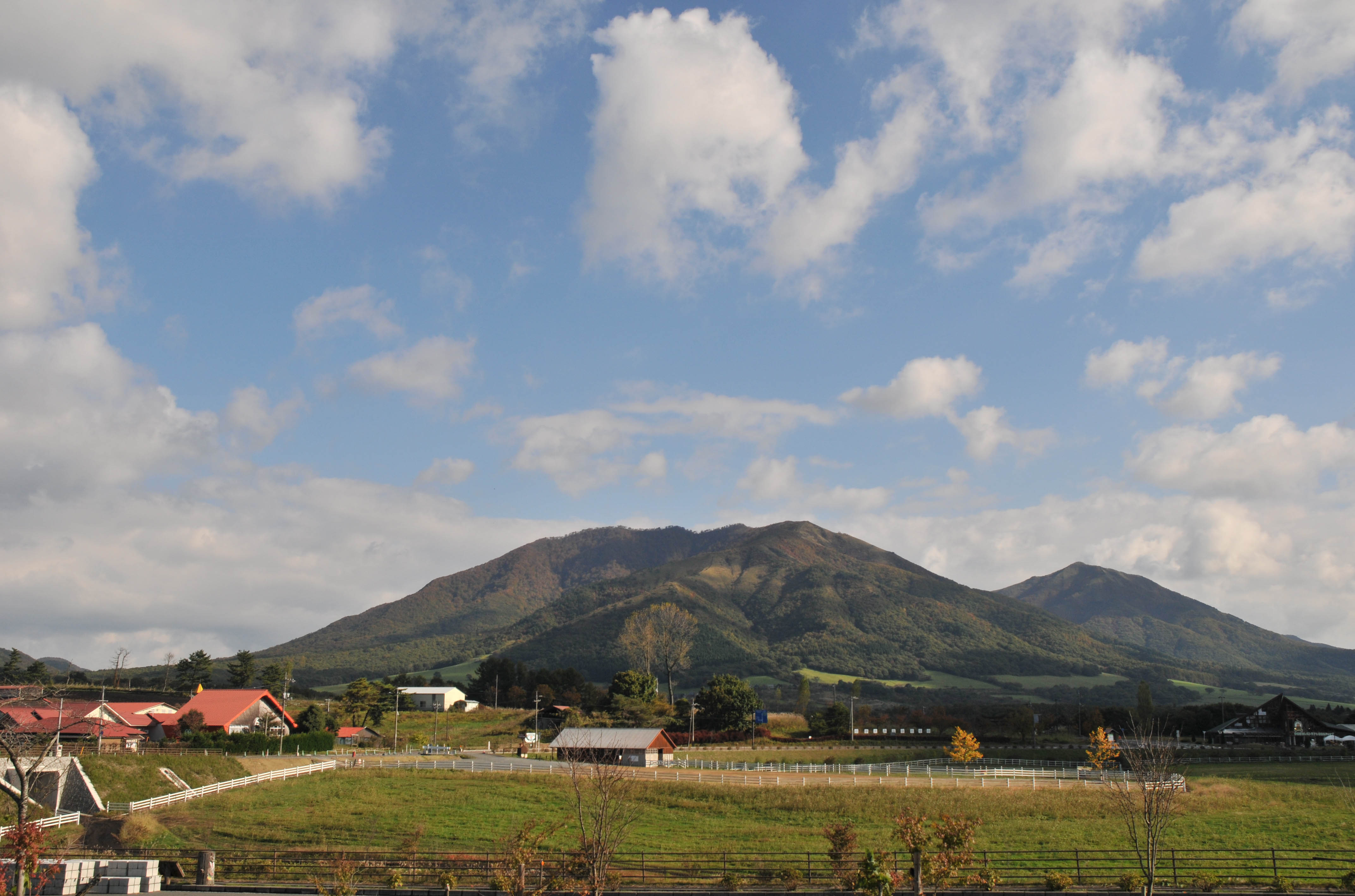
- View of Hiruzen Plateau

- Flag Emblem
- Interactive map of Maniwa
- Location in Japan
- Coordinates: 35°4′33″N 133°45′9″E
- Country: Japan
- Region: Chūgoku (San'yō)
- Prefecture: Okayama

Government
  - Mayor: Noboru Ota (since April 2013)

Area
  - Total: 828.53 km^{2} (319.90 sq mi)

Population (February 1, 2023)
  - Total: 42,477
  - Density: 51.268/km^{2} (132.78/sq mi)
- Time zone: UTC+09:00 (JST)
- City hall address: 2927-2 Kuse, Maniwa-shi, Okayama-ken 719-3292
- Website: Official website
- Symbols
- Flower: Cherry blossom
- Tree: Chamaecyparis obtusa

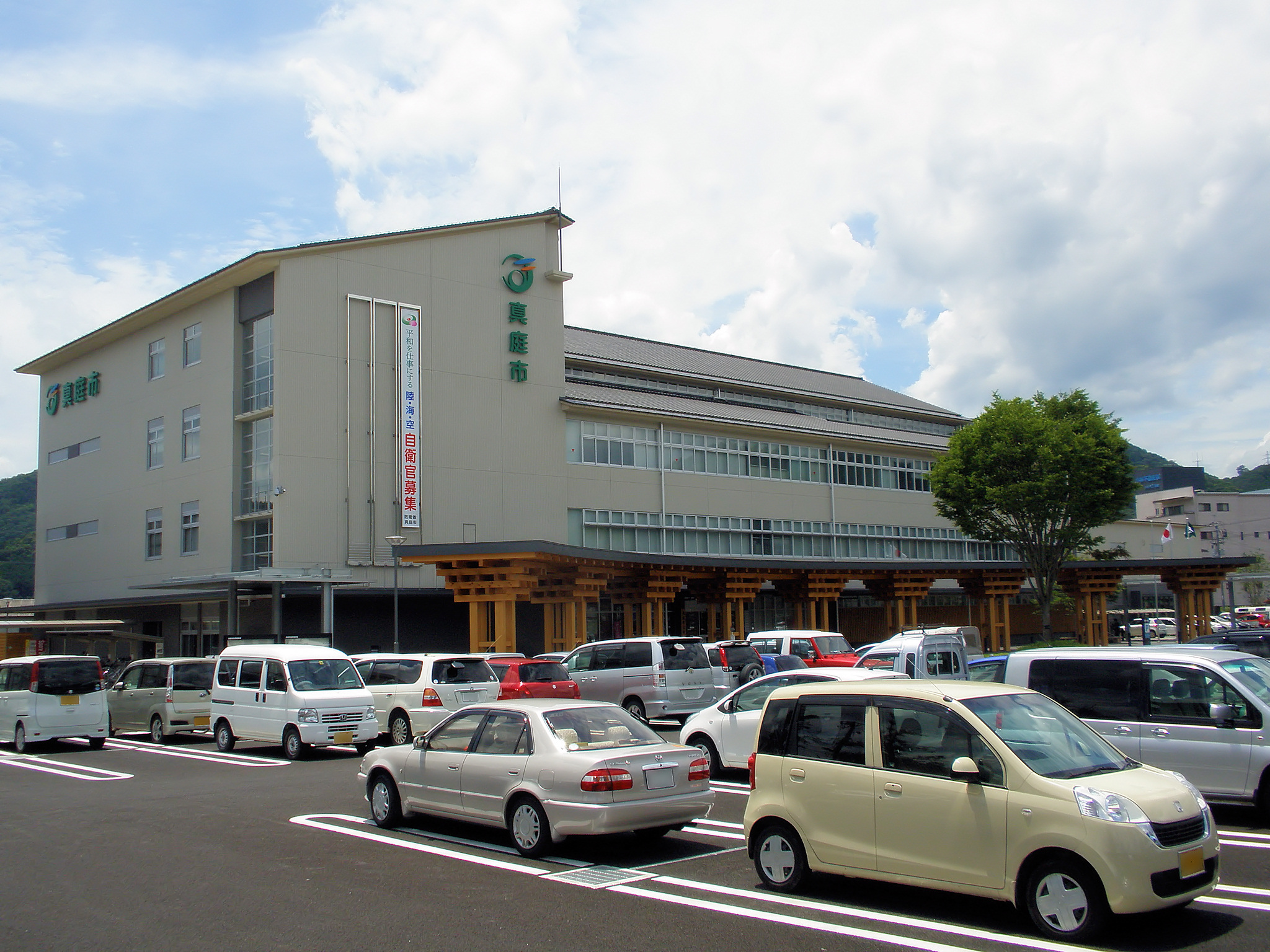
Maniwa City Hall

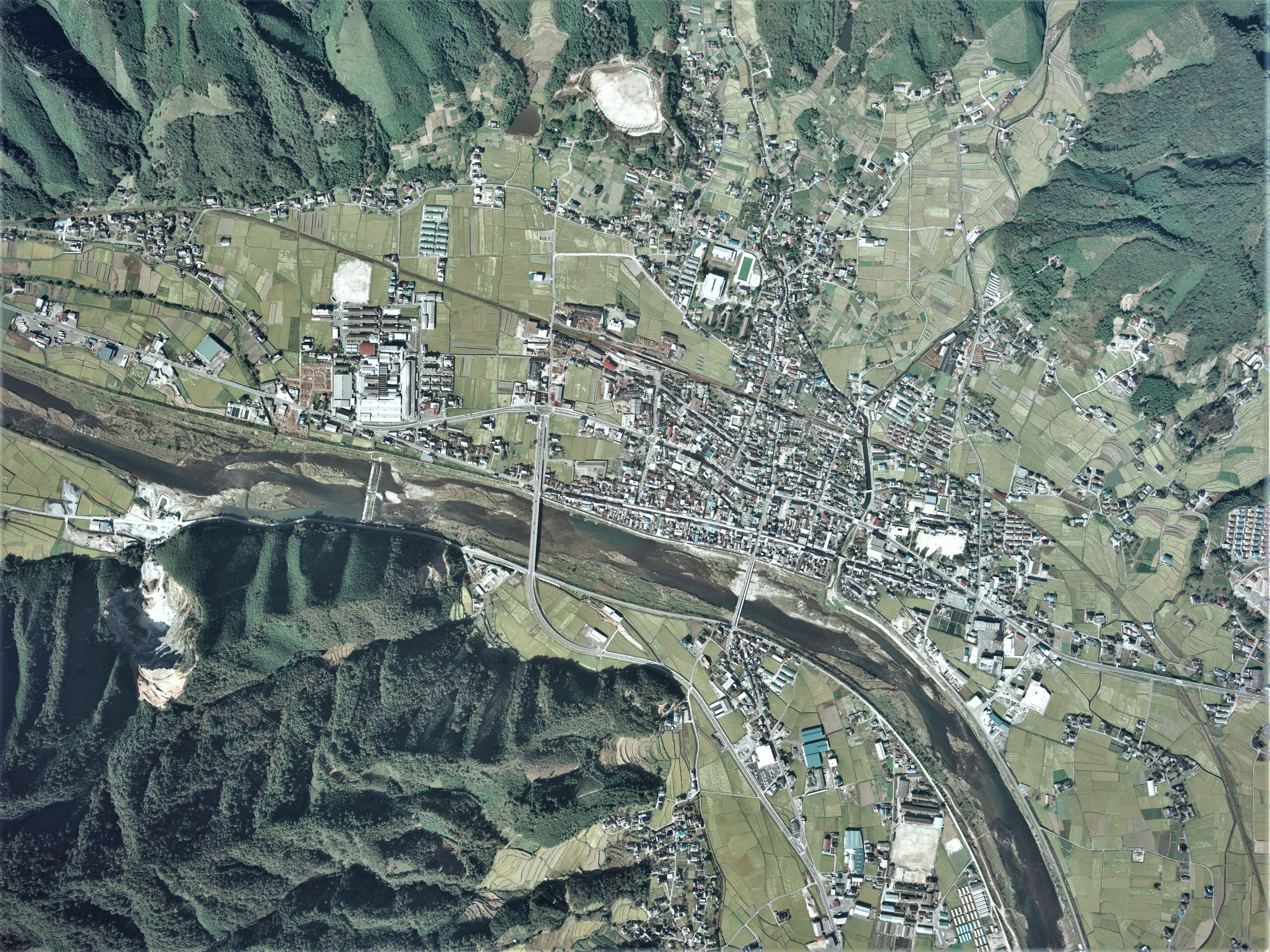
Aerial view of Kuse area of Maniwa

Maniwa (真庭市, Maniwa-shi) is a city located in Okayama Prefecture, Japan. As of 1 February 2023, the city had an estimated population of 42,477 in 17568 households and a population density of 51 persons per km^{2}. The total area of the city is 828.53 square kilometres (319.90 sq mi).

== Geography ==
Maniwa is located in north-central Okayama Prefecture and is approximately in the center of the Chūgoku Mountains, which forms its northern border with Tottori Prefecture. Occupying 11.6% of Okayama Prefecture, it has the largest area of any municipality in the prefecture. It measures roughly 55 km from North to South, and 35 km from east to west. The mountainous part of the city to the north is dominated by Mount Hiruzen (1,202 m (3,944 ft)) and the Hiruzen Highlands, which is the source of the Asahi River, emerges from Mount Hiruzen in Maniwa, and its upper reaches are located within the town. The river has approximately 146 tributaries and a length of 142 kilometres (88 mi). Major tributaries of the Asahi in Maniwa include the Bitchū, Nakazui, Kōchi, Meki, and the Shinjō rivers. The Hiruzen Highlands sit at an elevation of 500–600 meters above sea-level, and is part of the Daisen-Oki National Park. With Maniwa being far from any major fault lines, the chance of an earthquake above 7.0 magnitude is less than 1%, small compared to other areas of Japan.

- Dams
  - Hokubo Dam
  - Yubara Dam
- Lakes
  - Lake Yubara

=== Adjoining municipalities ===
Okayama Prefecture

- Kagamino
- Kibichūō
- Misaki
- Niimi
- Shinjō
- Takahashi
- Tsuyama

Tottori Prefecture

- Kōfu
- Kurayoshi
- Misasa

=== Climate ===
Maniwa's climate varies greatly from north to south. The Hiruzen Highlands up north, due to being at a higher elevation, tend to be much cooler in the summer, with heavy snow in the winter, and temperatures often dropping into the negatives. However, further down south in Kuse to Hokubo, snow may fall in the winter but rarely accumulates, but the summers are hotter in comparison to Hiruzen.

Maniwa is also situated far in land, which means that typhoons often do not affect it as badly as seaside towns in Okayama. The mountains throughout the town create a barrier from extremely heavy winds, and so often rain is the biggest side effect of any typhoons passing nearby.

Climate data for Kuse, Maniwa (1991−2020 normals, extremes 1978−present)
Month	Jan	Feb	Mar	Apr	May	Jun	Jul	Aug	Sep	Oct	Nov	Dec	Year
Record high °C (°F)	16.7 (62.1)	21.8 (71.2)	26.4 (79.5)	32.4 (90.3)	33.7 (92.7)	36.7 (98.1)	37.9 (100.2)	39.3 (102.7)	36.8 (98.2)	31.8 (89.2)	26.0 (78.8)	20.5 (68.9)	39.3 (102.7)
Mean daily maximum °C (°F)	7.4 (45.3)	8.7 (47.7)	13.0 (55.4)	19.5 (67.1)	24.6 (76.3)	27.4 (81.3)	31.1 (88.0)	32.6 (90.7)	27.9 (82.2)	22.1 (71.8)	15.7 (60.3)	9.7 (49.5)	20.0 (68.0)
Daily mean °C (°F)	2.2 (36.0)	3.0 (37.4)	6.4 (43.5)	12.1 (53.8)	17.4 (63.3)	21.4 (70.5)	25.4 (77.7)	26.2 (79.2)	21.9 (71.4)	15.6 (60.1)	9.4 (48.9)	4.2 (39.6)	13.8 (56.8)
Mean daily minimum °C (°F)	−1.5 (29.3)	−1.3 (29.7)	1.1 (34.0)	5.6 (42.1)	11.1 (52.0)	16.6 (61.9)	21.2 (70.2)	21.9 (71.4)	17.6 (63.7)	10.9 (51.6)	5.0 (41.0)	0.5 (32.9)	9.1 (48.3)
Record low °C (°F)	−10.9 (12.4)	−10.6 (12.9)	−7.0 (19.4)	−3.1 (26.4)	0.0 (32.0)	5.8 (42.4)	11.0 (51.8)	14.4 (57.9)	5.4 (41.7)	0.7 (33.3)	−2.7 (27.1)	−8.5 (16.7)	−10.9 (12.4)
Average precipitation mm (inches)	58.1 (2.29)	63.6 (2.50)	104.0 (4.09)	113.9 (4.48)	142.5 (5.61)	185.1 (7.29)	241.5 (9.51)	135.3 (5.33)	183.2 (7.21)	102.6 (4.04)	62.8 (2.47)	64.5 (2.54)	1,457.2 (57.37)
Average precipitation days (≥ 1.0 mm)	9.8	10.5	11.7	9.8	10.4	11.7	13.0	9.8	10.2	7.7	7.6	9.7	121.9
Mean monthly sunshine hours	102.8	116.6	157.0	182.1	190.6	140.9	139.9	174.1	144.8	151.3	120.2	102.7	1,722.9
Source: Japan Meteorological Agency

Climate data for Yatsuka, Maniwa (1991−2020 normals, extremes 1978−present)
Month	Jan	Feb	Mar	Apr	May	Jun	Jul	Aug	Sep	Oct	Nov	Dec	Year
Record high °C (°F)	15.0 (59.0)	18.7 (65.7)	23.5 (74.3)	30.9 (87.6)	30.3 (86.5)	32.8 (91.0)	34.5 (94.1)	34.9 (94.8)	33.2 (91.8)	30.0 (86.0)	23.8 (74.8)	18.7 (65.7)	34.9 (94.8)
Mean daily maximum °C (°F)	4.3 (39.7)	5.2 (41.4)	9.7 (49.5)	16.4 (61.5)	21.3 (70.3)	24.1 (75.4)	27.8 (82.0)	29.0 (84.2)	24.4 (75.9)	19.1 (66.4)	13.5 (56.3)	7.3 (45.1)	16.8 (62.3)
Daily mean °C (°F)	0.3 (32.5)	0.7 (33.3)	4.1 (39.4)	9.6 (49.3)	14.7 (58.5)	18.8 (65.8)	23.0 (73.4)	23.7 (74.7)	19.4 (66.9)	13.3 (55.9)	7.8 (46.0)	2.7 (36.9)	11.5 (52.7)
Mean daily minimum °C (°F)	−3.5 (25.7)	−3.7 (25.3)	−1.2 (29.8)	2.9 (37.2)	8.4 (47.1)	14.2 (57.6)	19.3 (66.7)	19.8 (67.6)	15.3 (59.5)	8.4 (47.1)	2.8 (37.0)	−1.4 (29.5)	6.8 (44.2)
Record low °C (°F)	−15.8 (3.6)	−20.2 (−4.4)	−14.1 (6.6)	−7.3 (18.9)	−4.1 (24.6)	1.7 (35.1)	7.0 (44.6)	10.5 (50.9)	0.9 (33.6)	−3.2 (26.2)	−6.1 (21.0)	−13.4 (7.9)	−20.2 (−4.4)
Average precipitation mm (inches)	174.0 (6.85)	152.4 (6.00)	161.7 (6.37)	126.7 (4.99)	142.3 (5.60)	181.3 (7.14)	252.3 (9.93)	168.4 (6.63)	275.3 (10.84)	187.4 (7.38)	142.2 (5.60)	162.3 (6.39)	2,126.4 (83.72)
Average snowfall cm (inches)	189 (74)	169 (67)	67 (26)	1 (0.4)	0 (0)	0 (0)	0 (0)	0 (0)	0 (0)	0 (0)	2 (0.8)	94 (37)	511 (201)
Average precipitation days (≥ 1.0 mm)	19.2	16.4	16.0	12.3	11.2	12.6	14.4	11.5	13.5	12.0	14.1	17.9	171.1
Average snowy days (≥ 3 cm)	15.5	13.3	6.9	0.1	0	0	0	0	0	0	0.2	7.2	43.2
Mean monthly sunshine hours	47.6	57.8	123.4	171.5	191.7	141.7	137.5	167.2	120.6	123.8	95.5	68.2	1,446.4
Source: Japan Meteorological Agency

=== Demographics ===
Per Japanese census data, the population of Maniwa in 2020 is 42,725 people. Maniwa has been conducting censuses since 1920.

Historical population
Year	Pop.	±%
1920	64,520	—
1925	64,727	+0.3%
1930	66,933	+3.4%
1935	68,819	+2.8%
1940	68,902	+0.1%
1945	84,235	+22.3%
1950	84,513	+0.3%
1955	82,575	−2.3%
1960	76,198	−7.7%
1965	68,419	−10.2%
1970	62,608	−8.5%
1975	61,152	−2.3%
1980	60,586	−0.9%
1985	60,196	−0.6%
1990	58,754	−2.4%
1995	56,607	−3.7%
2000	54,747	−3.3%
2005	51,782	−5.4%
2010	48,976	−5.4%
2015	46,124	−5.8%
2020	42,725	−7.4%
Maniwa population statistics

== History ==
The area of Maniwa is part of ancient Mimasaka Province. From 1764 to 1871 it developed as the castle town of Katsuyama Domain, a 23,000 koku holding of the Miura clan. Following the Meiji restoration, Katsuyama village was established with the creation of the modern municipalities system on June 1, 1889. It was raised to town status on February 26, 1896. The modern city of Maniwa was established on March 31, 2005, from the merger of Katsuyama with the town of Hokubō (from Jōbō District); the towns of Ochiai, Yubara and Kuse, and the villages of Mikamo, Kawakami, Yatsuka and Chūka (all from Maniwa District), the latter three which make up the area of Hiruzen as a whole.

== Government ==
Maniwa has a mayor-council form of government with a directly elected mayor and a unicameral city council of 24 members. Maniwa, collectively with the village of Shinjō, contributes one member to the Okayama Prefectural Assembly. In terms of national politics, the city is part of the Okayama 3rd district of the lower house of the Diet of Japan.

== Economy ==
With thriving lumber industries, Maniwa is investing heavily in sustainable development of its resources. Approximately 80% of Maniwa's land is covered in forest, 60% of which was planted after World War Two. Maniwa is also currently known for its Biomass initiatives, and has been given the title of a "Biomass Town", alongside 317 other areas within Japan. It has a biomass electric power plant, which runs using woody biomass in the forms of by-products of the city's lumber industries and household waste. The plant products over 10,000 kW, and can power more than 22,000 of Maniwa's homes, of which it sells some of the energy back to the National Grid. The City Office in Kuse is also fueled by a biomass boiler, and also uses solar panels in an attempt to reduce its carbon footprint.

== Education ==
Maniwa has 24 public elementary schools and six public junior high school operated by the city government, and two public high schools operated by the Okayama prefectural Board of Education.

== Transportation ==
=== Railway ===
JR West (JR West) - Kishin Line

- Mimasaka-Oiwake - Mimasaka-Ochiai - Komi - Kuse - Chūgoku-Katsuyama - Tsukida - Tomihara

=== Highways ===
- Chūgoku Expressway - Mimasaka-Oiwake Parking Area - Ochiai Junction - Ochiai Interchange - Maniwa Parking Area - Hokubō Junction - Hokubō Interchange
- Okayama Expressway - Hokubō Junction
- Yonago Expressway - Ochiai Junction - Kuse Interchange - Ueno Parking Area - Yubara Interchange - Hiruzen-Kōgen Service Area - Hiruzen Interchange
- National Route 181
- National Route 313
- National Route 482

==== Roadside stations ====
- Daigo Village (醍醐の里, Daigo no Sato)
- House of Wind (風の家, Kaze no Ie)
- Hiruzen Plateau (蒜山高原, Hiruzen Kōgen)

== Sister cities ==
- Victor Harbor, Australia - Sister city agreement concluded on May 26, 2000, with the former Hiruzen area. However, since the merger to create Maniwa City occurred, this arrangement is no longer in effect.
- Ruijin, China - Friendship city agreement concluded on January 16, 2001

== Local attractions ==
=== Hiruzen ===
80% of tourists visit the Hiruzen Highlands, which are known as one of the more popular resort areas in Western Japan. Due to its high elevation, the highlands remain cool in the summer, whilst gains heavy snow in the winter, making it popular with local skiers. Hiruzen also is home to the largest Jersey Cow Farm in Japan, with the "Jersey Land" facilities giving tourists the ability to see the cows up close, milk them, and eat foods made from the Jersey milk. The highlands are also known for their "Cycling Road", a 30 km loop of well-maintained cycling paths, with various rental shops along the route.

=== Yubara ===
Yubara Onsen is also a popular resort, with its numerous hot springs (onsen), and close proximity to Hiruzen. Its most well-known onsen, "Sunayu", has been designated one of the representative hot springs of West Japan, and sits at the base of Yubara Dam. It is a rare mixed-sex onsen, and is also free and open 24/7.

=== Katsuyama ===
Maniwa is also home to one of Japan's Top 100 waterfalls, Kanba Waterfall. Standing at 110 meters tall and 20 meters wide, it is the largest waterfall in West Japan. It is also home to groups of Japanese macaque, most often seen during the winter as they come to the valley floor in search of food.

Katsuyama is also an old castle town, which prospered as a stop along the Izumo Kaido, a trade route stretching from Izumo to Kyoto and Osaka. It was also a port, as the river stretches down to Okayama City, and would only take a day or so to reach on the shallow boats they used at the time. Natsume Soseki also stayed here during a war for a few weeks. The town dedicated a 600m stretch of streets to preserve as it would have been in the Edo Period, including the burying of powerlines and reduction of street lights. Currently, the town is known for its Noren curtains, which hang 24/7 outside most homes and shops, and are all made by Yoko Kano, a local artist.

=== Kuse ===
Kuse, home to the main city office, is also known for the "Former Senkyo Elementary School." Built in a Western style in 1907, the school is no longer used day-to-day, and has become a tourist attraction. With certain dramas such as "Always" having been filmed here, it is often popular with fans of those dramas. Free to the public, the school also provides Japanese school uniforms you can try at no cost.

=== Ochiai ===
Further down south, Ochiai is most famous for the "Daigo-Sakura", a 1000+ year old cherry tree. Sat at the top of a hill deep in the mountains, this cherry blossom tree tends to bloom between mid-late April. A smaller tree, birthed from the original, sits close by on the hilltop. The name "Daigo-Sakura" came from former Emperor Go-Daigo, who, when on his way to exile in the Oki Islands, stopped by this tree and apparently was most impressed by it.

Ochiai is also known for its yōkan, a Japanese sweet made from red beans (anko). In the shape of the narrow boats that used to carry goods down the river to Okayama, and with a light crust of sugar, these sweets are very popular as souvenirs from the city.

=== Hokubo ===
At the southernmost tip of Maniwa, Hokubo is most well known for its fireflies in June. One of the best breeding grounds in the prefecture, many tourists visit during this time to see the fireflies during their mating season.

== Notable places and events ==
- Bitchu-Ana Cave, Hokubo
- Daigo-Sakura (1000+ year old Cherry Blossom tree)
- Former Senkyō Elementary School Building (Important Cultural Property)
- Hiruzen Area
  - Hiruzen Jersey Land
  - Hiruzen Kōgen Center / Joyful Park (Amusement park)
  - Hiruzen Plateau
  - Mount Hiruzen
  - Shiogama Reisen (Japan's Top 100 Cold Springs)
  - Ski resorts
- Hotaru-no-Sato, Hokubo.
- Kanba Waterfall (Japan's Top 100 Waterfalls)
- The old castle town of Mimasaka-Katsuyama
- Yubara Onsen town

=== Festivals ===
- Hiruzen Omiya Obon Dance Festival (Nationally Designated Important Cultural Property)
- Katsuyama Festival (October 19–20)
- Kuse Festival (October 25–26)

=== Onsen ===
- Yubara Onsen
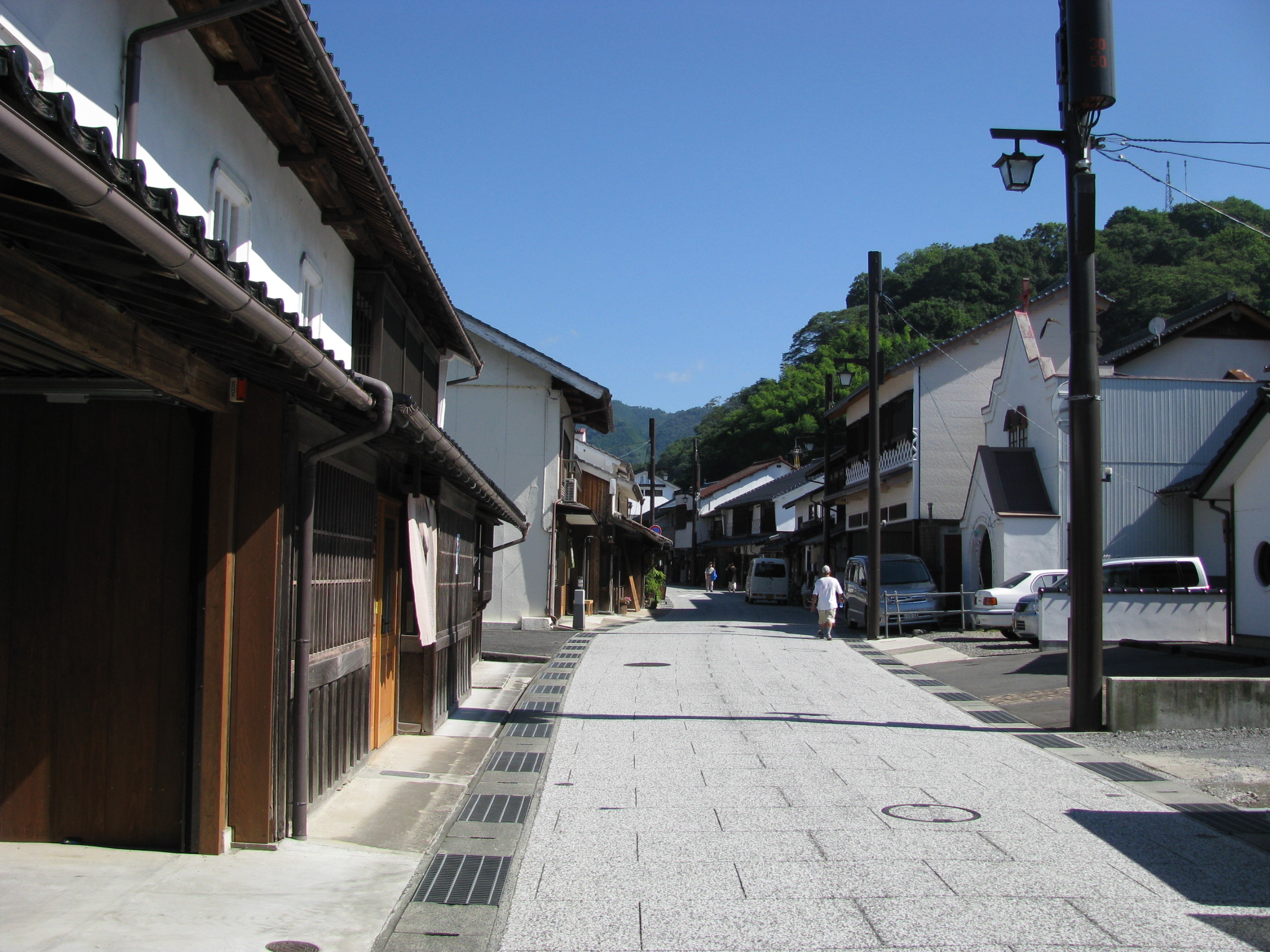
The old castle town of Mimasaka-Katsuyama

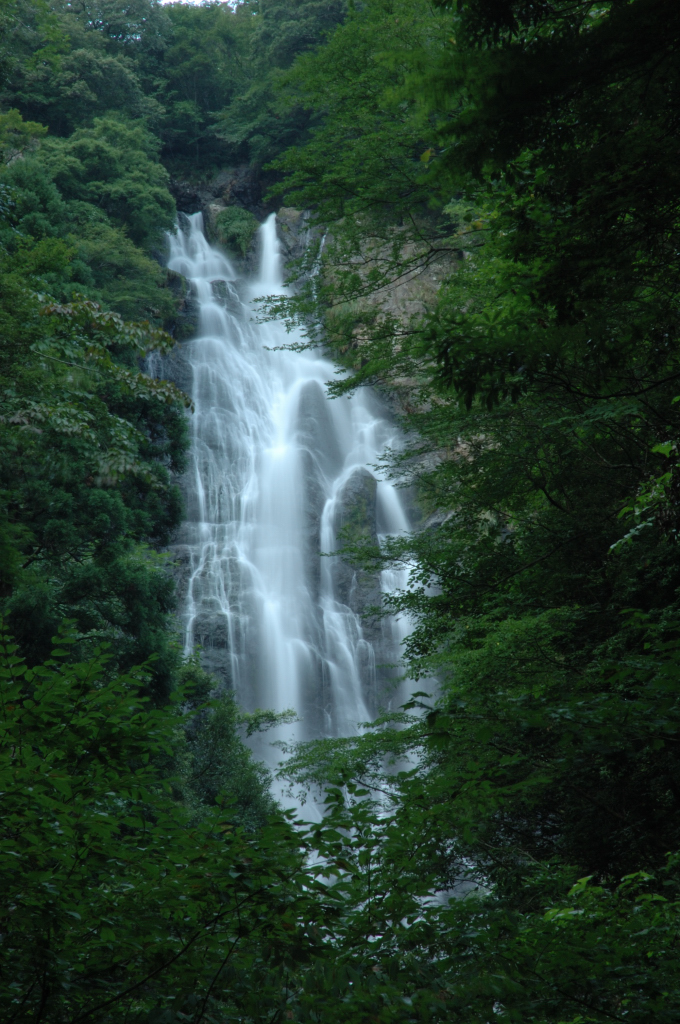
Kanba Waterfall

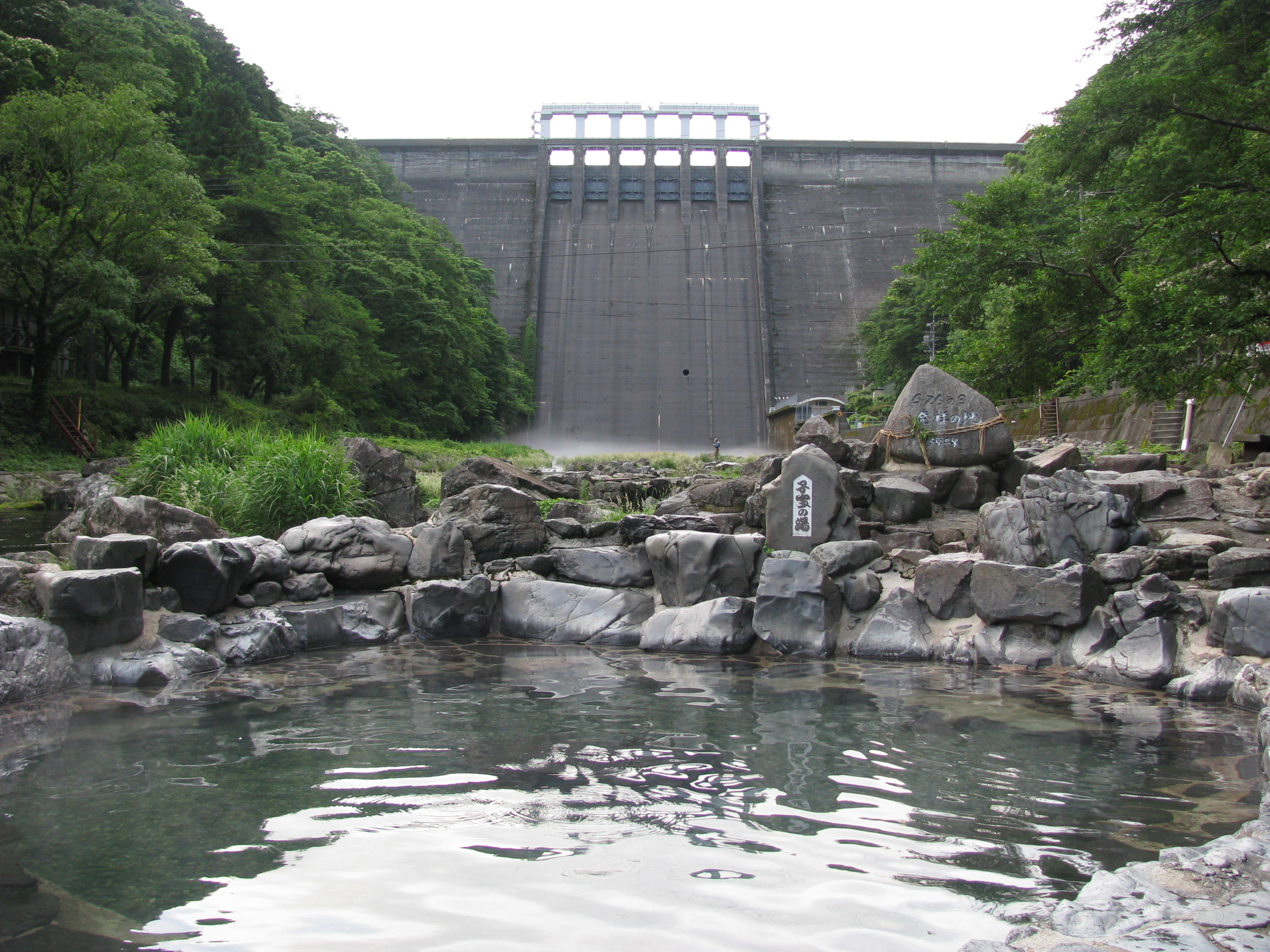
Yubara Onsen

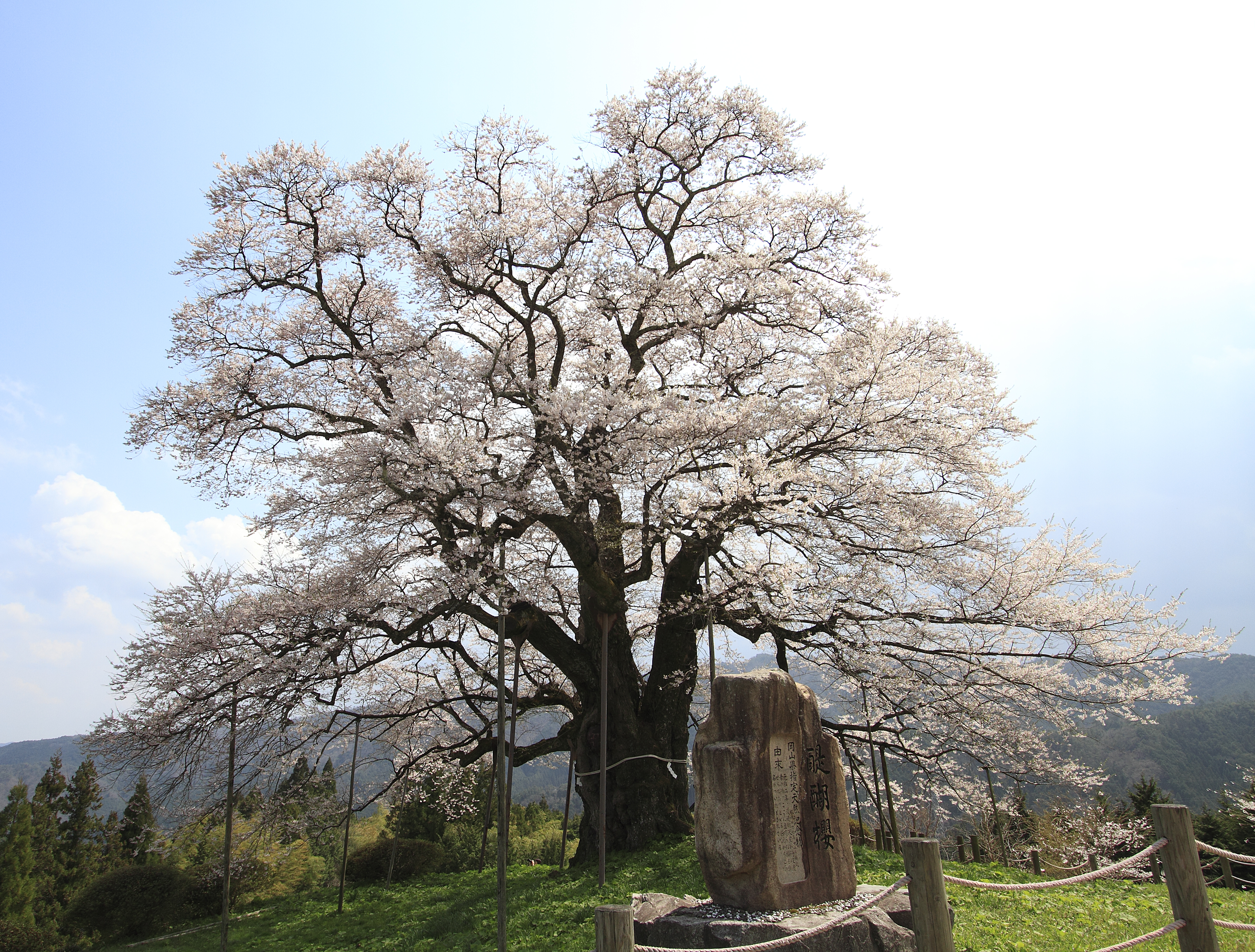
Daigo sakura

== Noted people from Maniwa ==
- Issei Mamehara, member of JO1
- Yoichi Numata, actor
