= Kuse, Okayama =

Kuse 久世町
- Former municipality
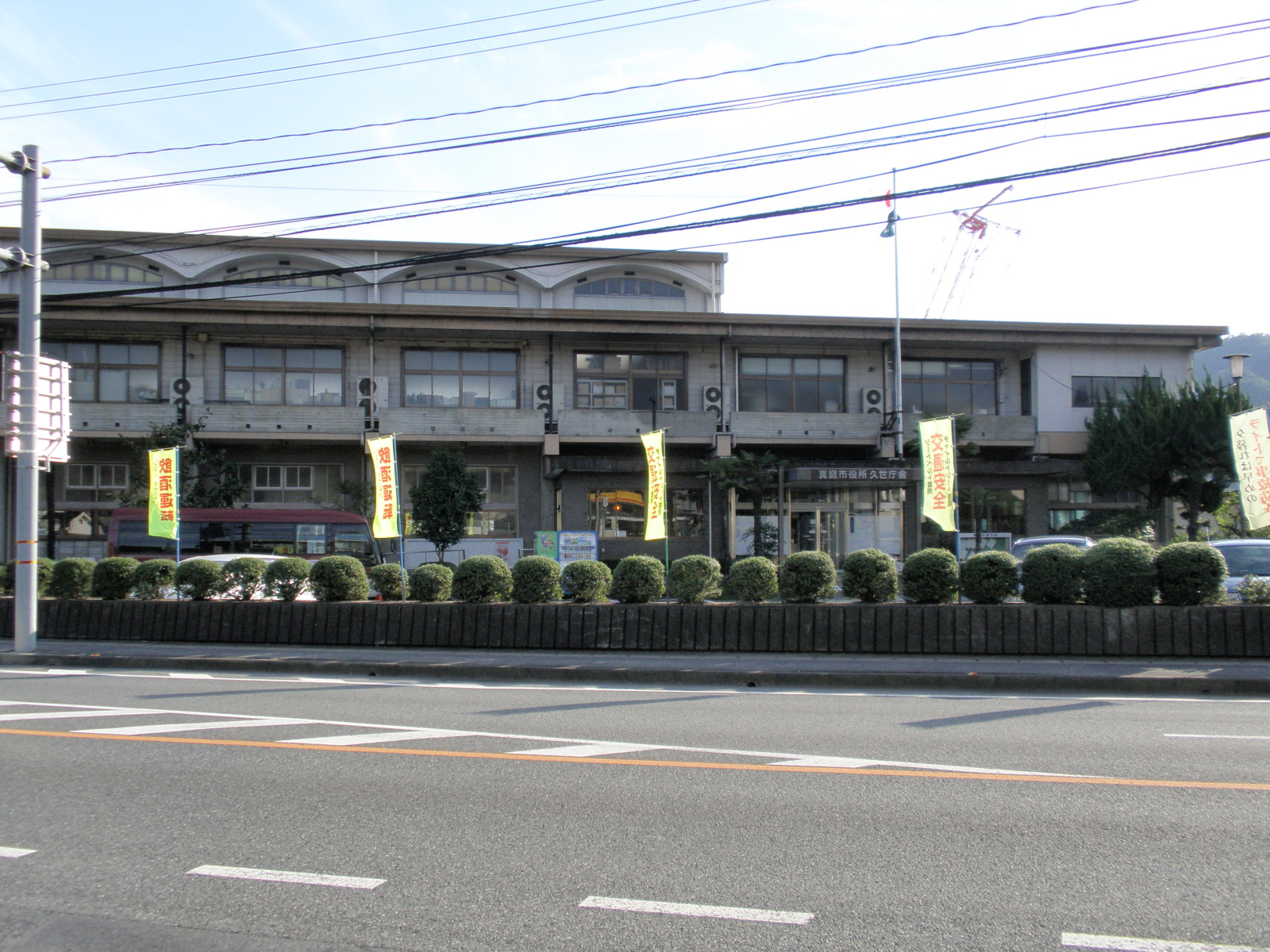
- Former Kuse town hall (not extant)

- Location in Japan
- Coordinates: 35°4′33.4″N 133°45′12.1″E
- Country: Japan
- Region: Chūgoku
- Prefecture: Okayama Prefecture
- District: Maniwa
- Merged: March 31, 2005 (now part of Maniwa)

Area
  - Total: 75.12 km^{2} (29.00 sq mi)

Population (2003)
  - Total: 11,424
  - Density: 152.08/km^{2} (393.9/sq mi)
- Time zone: UTC+09:00 (JST)
- Symbols
- Bird: Japanese bush-warbler
- Flower: Cherry blossom
- Tree: Zelkova serrata

Kuse (久世町, Kuse-chō) was a town located in Maniwa District, Okayama Prefecture, Japan.

As of 2003, the town had an estimated population of 11,424 and a density of 152.08 persons per km^{2}. The total area was 75.12 km^{2}.

On March 31, 2005, Kuse, along with the town of Hokubō (from Jōbō District), and towns of Katsuyama, Ochiai and Yubara, and the villages of Chūka, Kawakami, Mikamo and Yatsuka (all from Maniwa District) were merged to create the city of Maniwa.

== Geography ==
- Rivers: Asahi River (The big-3 river through Okayama)

=== Adjoining municipalities ===
- Okayama Prefecture
  - Katsuyama
  - Ochiai
  - Yubara
  - Tsuyama (Former Kume town)
  - Kagamino (Former Kagamino town and Tomi village)

== Education ==
- Senkyō Elementary School
- Meki Elementary School
- Kashimura Elementary School
- Kusakabe Elementary School
- Yono Elementary School
- Kuse Junior High School
- Okayama Prefectural Kuse High School

== Transportation ==
=== Railways ===
- West Japan Railway Company
  - Kishin Line
    - Kuse Station

=== Road ===
- Expressways:
  - Yonago Expressway
    - Kuse Interchange - Ueno Parking Area
- National highways:
  - Route 181
  - Route 313
- Prefectural roads:
  - Okayama Prefectural Route 65 (Kuse-Chūka)
  - Okayama Prefectural Route 82 (Kagamino-Kuse)
  - Okayama Prefectural Route 326 (Kashinishi-Yubara)
  - Okayama Prefectural Route 327 (Tomihigashidani-Kuse)
  - Okayama Prefectural Route 329 (Nishibara-Kuse)
  - Okayama Prefectural Route 330 (Meki-Ōba)

== Notable places and events ==
- Former Senkyō Elementary School Building (Important Cultural Properties)
- Kuse Festival (October 25–26)
