= Yatsuka, Okayama =

Yatsuka 八束村
- Former municipality
- Location in Japan
- Coordinates: 35°17′13.4″N 133°42′3.7″E
- Country: Japan
- Region: Chūgoku
- Prefecture: Okayama Prefecture
- District: Maniwa
- Merged: March 31, 2005 (now part of Maniwa)

Area
  - Total: 61.19 km^{2} (23.63 sq mi)

Population (2003)
  - Total: 2,946
  - Density: 48.15/km^{2} (124.7/sq mi)
- Time zone: UTC+09:00 (JST)
- Symbols
- Bird: Japanese bush-warbler
- Flower: Menyanthes
- Tree: Ginkgo biloba

Yatsuka (八束村, Yatsuka-son) was a village located in Maniwa District, Okayama Prefecture, Japan.

As of 2003, the village had an estimated population of 2,946 and a density of 48.15 persons per km^{2}. The total area was 61.19 km^{2}.

On March 31, 2005, Yatsuka, along with the town of Hokubō (from Jōbō District), and towns of Katsuyama, Kuse, Ochiai and Yubara, and the villages of Chūka, Kawakami and Mikamo (all from Maniwa District) were merged to create the city of Maniwa.

== Geography ==
- Mountains: Mount Hiruzen (蒜山, Hiruzen)
- Rivers: Asahi River (The big-3 river through Okayama Prefecture)

=== Adjoining municipalities ===
- Okayama Prefecture
  - Yubara
  - Kawakami
  - Chūka
- Tottori Prefecture
  - Kurayoshi (Former Sekigane town)

== Economy ==
=== Agriculture ===
- Dairy (Jersey cattle, milk)

== Education ==
- Yatsuka Elementary School
- Hiruzen Junior High School
- Okayama Prefectural Hiruzen High School

== Transportation ==
- Expressways:
  - Yonago Expressway
    - Hiruzen Interchange (Kawakami)
- National highways:
  - Route 313
  - Route 482
- Prefectural roads:
  - Okayama Prefectural Route 324 (Higashikayabe-Shimofukuda)
  - Okayama Prefectural Route 325 (Bessho-Shimonagata)
  - Okayama Prefectural Route 422 (Hiruzen Kōgen)
  - Okayama Prefectural Route 702 (Yatsuka-Kawakami cycling road)
- Roadside Station
  - Hiruzen Kōgen

== Notable places and events ==
- Mount Hiruzen
- Hiruzen plateau (蒜山高原, Hiruzen Kōgen)
- Hiruzen Jersey Land
- Kamihiruzen Ski resort
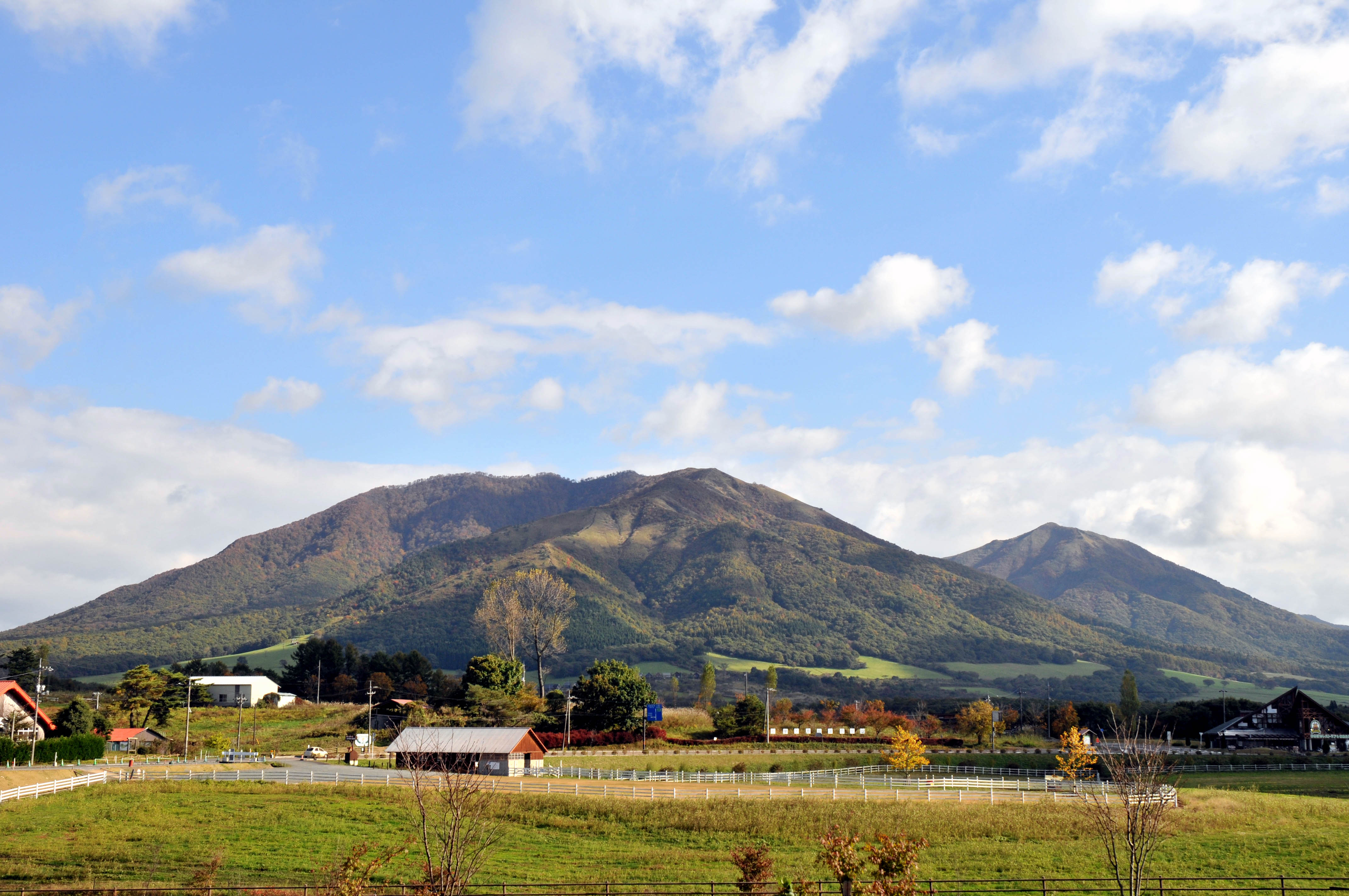
Mount Hiruzen

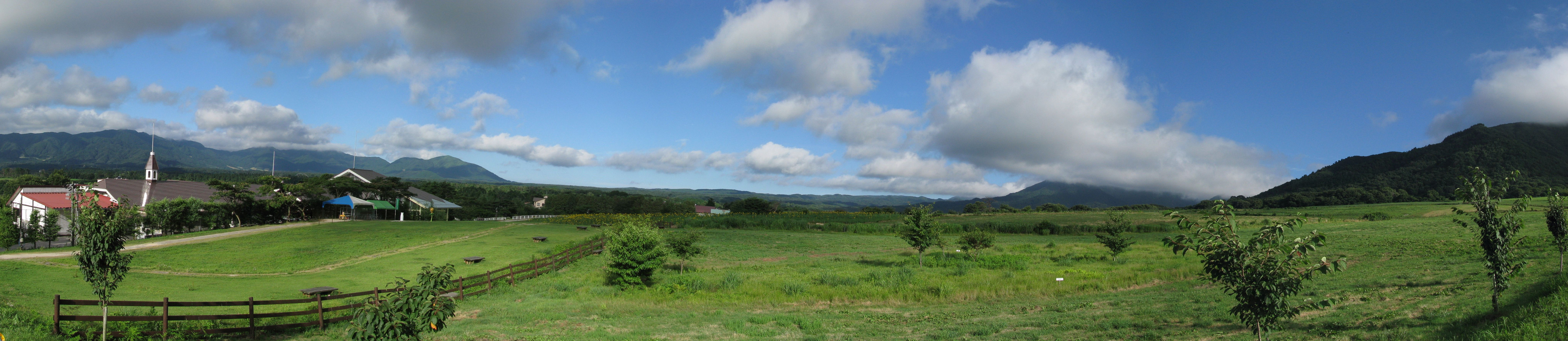
Hiruzen plateau

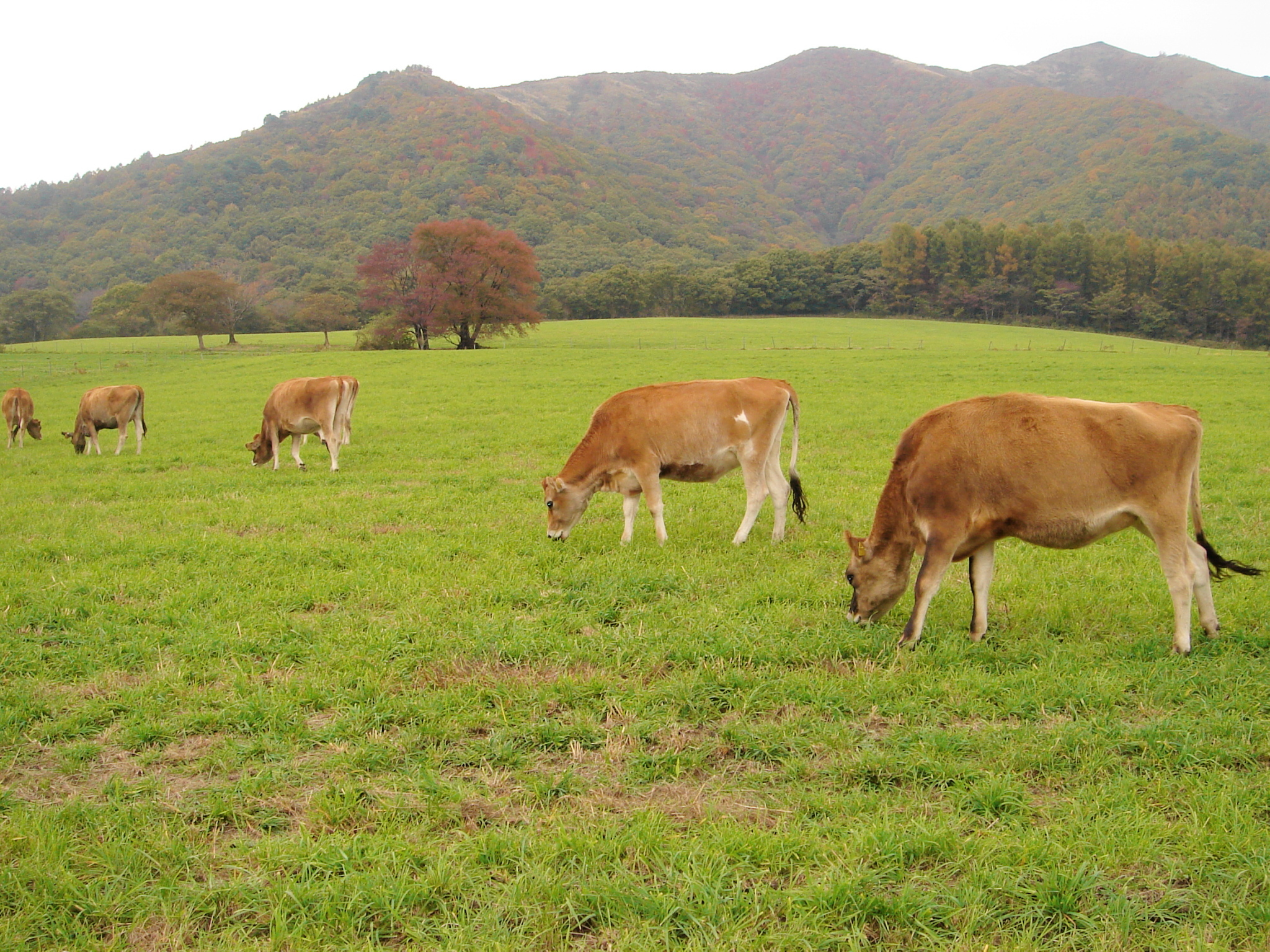
Hiruzen Jersey Land
