= Jōbō District, Okayama =

Former district in Okayama prefecture, Japan

Jōbō (上房郡, Jōbō-gun) was a district located in Okayama Prefecture, Japan.

As of 2003, the district had an estimated population of 16,967 and a density of 69.13 persons per km^{2}. The total area was 245.45 km^{2}.

== Towns and villages ==
- Hokubō
- Kayō
- Ukan

== Mergers ==
- On October 1, 2004 - the town of Ukan, along with the towns of Bitchū, Kawakami and Nariwa (all from Kawakami District), was merged into the expanded city of Takahashi.
- On October 1, 2004 - the town of Kayō, along with the town of Kamogawa (from Mitsu District), was merged to create the town of Kibichūō. The new town belongs to the newly created Kaga District, founded upon this merger.
- On March 31, 2005 - the town of Hokubō, along the towns of Katsuyama, Kuse, Ochiai and Yubara, and the villages of Chūka, Kawakami, Mikamo and Yatsuka (all from Maniwa District), was merged to create the city of Maniwa. Jōbō District was dissolved as a result of this merger.
