= Chūka, Okayama =

Dissolved municipality in Okayama prefecture, Japan

Chūka (中和村, Chūka-son) was a village located in Maniwa District, Okayama Prefecture, Japan.

As of 2003, the village had an estimated population of 800 and a density of 16.76 persons per km^{2}. The total area was 47.73 km^{2}.

On March 31, 2005, Chūka, along with the town of Hokubō (from Jōbō District), and towns of Katsuyama, Kuse, Ochiai and Yubara, and the villages of Kawakami, Mikamo and Yatsuka (all from Maniwa District) were merged to create the city of Maniwa.
