= Hokubō, Okayama =

Dissolved municipality in Okayama prefecture, Japan

Hokubō (北房町, Hokubō-chō) was a town located in Jōbō District, Okayama, Japan.

As of 2003, the town had an estimated population of 6,158 and a density of 86.51 persons per km^{2}. The total area was 71.18 km^{2}.

On March 31, 2005, Hokubō, along with the towns of Katsuyama, Kuse, Ochiai and Yubara, and the villages of Chūka, Kawakami, Mikamo and Yatsuka (all from Maniwa District), was merged to create the city of Maniwa.
