= Maniwa District, Okayama =

District in Okayama prefecture, Japan

Coordinates: 35°12′17″N 133°33′36″E

Location of Maniwa District in Okayama Prefecture

Maniwa (真庭郡, Maniwa-gun) is a district located in Okayama Prefecture, Japan.

In 2003 the district had an estimated population of 48,246 and a density of 58.53 persons per km^{2}. The total area is 824.35 km^{2}.

In 2005, the component towns and villages of Chūka, Katsuyama, Kawakami, Kuse, Mikamo, Ochiai, Yatsuka, Yubara, as well as the neighboring town of Hokubō (from Jōbō District) united to form the city of Maniwa. Currently only one village, Shinjō, belongs to Maniwa District.

== Current towns and villages (after the formation of Maniwa City) ==
- Shinjō

== Former towns and villages ==
- Chūka
- Katsuyama
- Kawakami
- Kuse
- Mikamo
- Ochiai
- Shinjō
- Yatsuka
- Yubara
