= Yubara Dam =

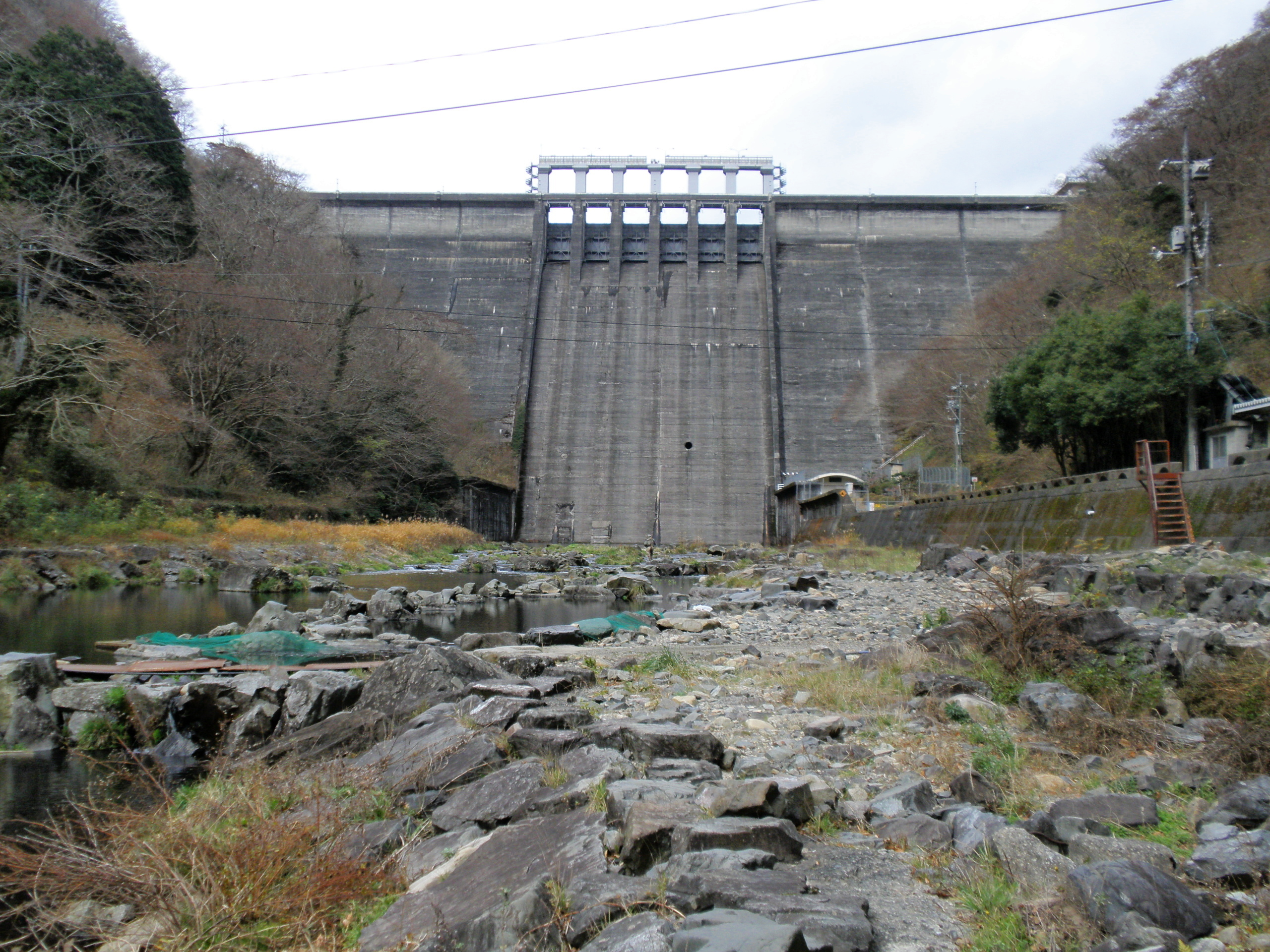
- Interactive map of Yubara Dam
- Location: Okayama Prefecture, Japan
- Coordinates: 35°12′29″N 133°43′58″E

Yubara Dam (Japanese: 湯原ダム) is a dam in Okayama Prefecture, Japan, completed in 1954.

At the base of the dam wall is a small village with a number of onsen hotels. There is also an outdoor, mixed bathing bath, or rotenburo, by the river. This facility is free.
