= Tsukida Station =

Railway station in Mainwa, Okayama Prefecture, Japan

Tsukida Station 月田駅
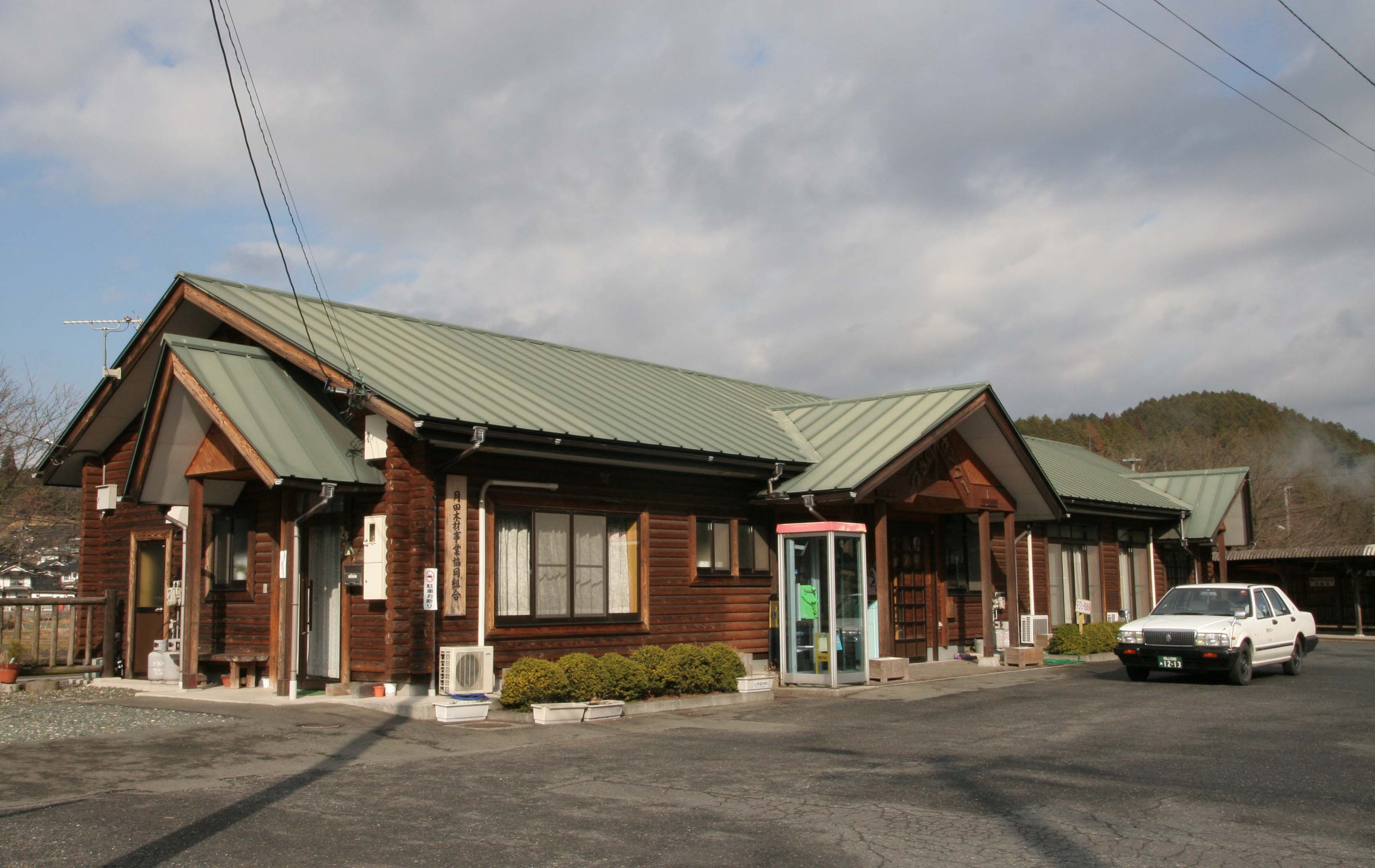
- Tsukida Station, January 2008

General information
- Location: 7445-2 Tsukida, Maniwa-shi, Okayama-ken 717-0024; Japan
- Coordinates: 35°2′53.58″N 133°40′0.70″E
- Owner: West Japan Railway Company
- Operator: West Japan Railway Company
- Line: K Kishin Line
- Distance: 128.6 km (79.9 miles) from Himeji
- Platforms: 1 side platform
- Connections: Bus stop

Other information
- Status: Unstaffed
- Website: Official website

History
- Opened: 11 December 1930; 95 years ago

Passengers
- FY2019: 54 daily
Location
- Location within Okayama Prefecture Location within Japan

Tsukida Station (月田駅, Tsukida-eki) is a passenger railway station located in the city of Maniwa, Okayama Prefecture, Japan, operated by West Japan Railway Company (JR West).

== Lines ==
Tsuboi Station is served by the Kishin Line, and is located 128.6 kilometers from the southern terminus of the line at Himeji.

== Station layout ==
The station consists of one ground-level side platform serving a single bi-directional track and a wooden station building. The station is unattended.

== Adjacent stations ==
«	Service	»
JR West Kishin Line
Chūgoku-Katsuyama	Rapid	Tomihara
Chūgoku-Katsuyama	Local	Tomihara

== History ==
Tsukida Station opened on December 11, 1930. With the privatization of the Japan National Railways (JNR) on April 1, 1987, the station came under the aegis of the West Japan Railway Company. The station building was rebuilt in 1994.

== Passenger statistics ==
In fiscal 2019, the station was used by an average of 54 passengers daily.

== See also ==
- List of railway stations in Japan
