= Sekigane, Tottori =

Dissolved municipality in Tottori prefecture, Japan

Sekigane (関金町, Sekigane-chō) was a town located in Tōhaku District, Tottori Prefecture, Japan.

== Population ==
As of 2003, the town had an estimated population of 4,160 and a density of 42.60 persons per km^{2}. The total area was 97.65 km^{2}.

== History ==
On March 22, 2005, Sekigane was merged into the expanded city of Kurayoshi.
