= Shinjō, Okayama =

Shinjō 新庄村
- Village
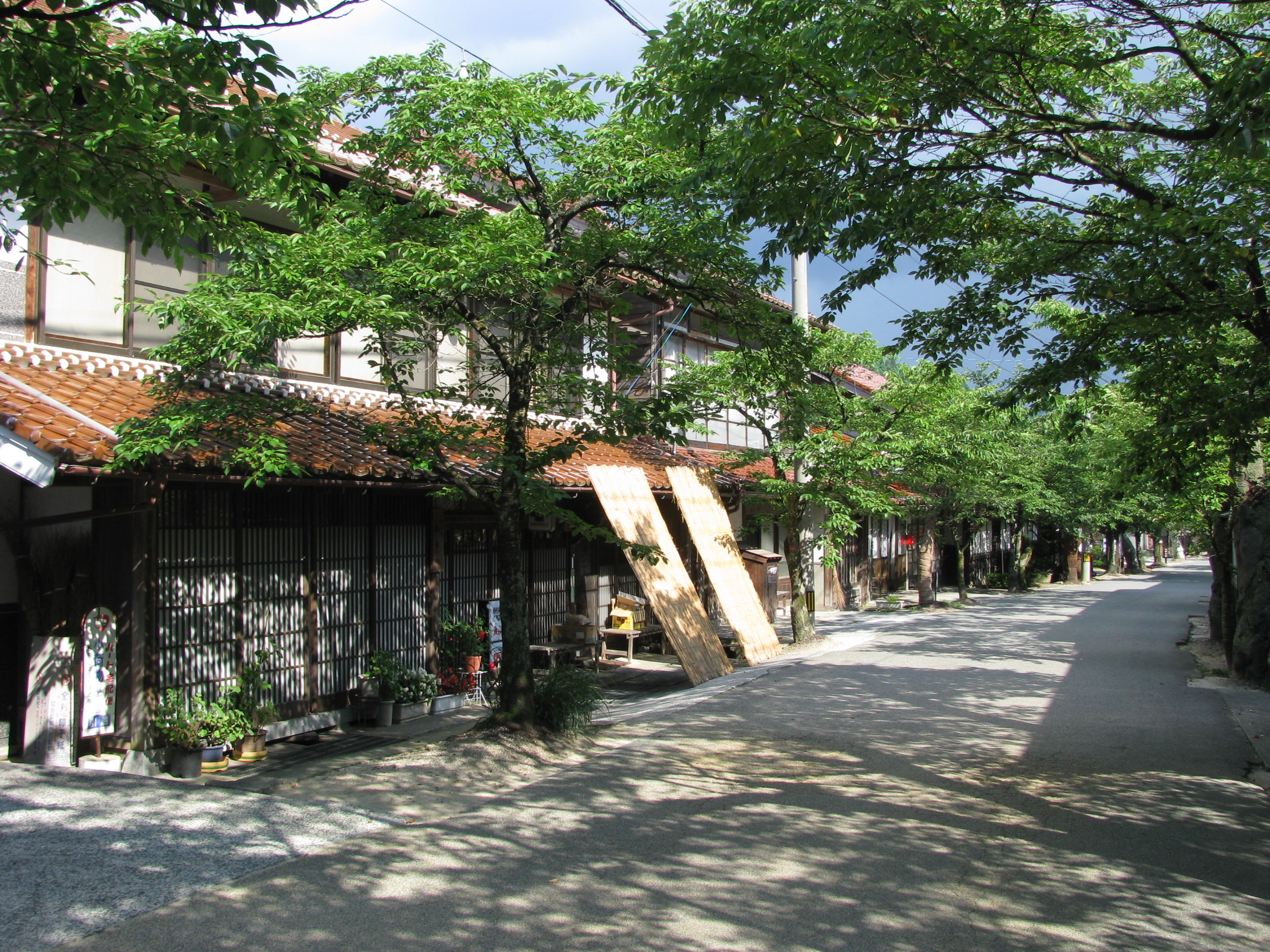
- Shinjō village

- Flag Chapter
- Location of Shinjō in Okayama Prefecture

- Location in Japan
- Coordinates: 35°10′46″N 133°34′05″E
- Country: Japan
- Region: Chūgoku; San'yō
- Prefecture: Okayama
- District: Maniwa

Area
  - Total: 67.11 km^{2} (25.91 sq mi)

Population (November 30, 2022)
  - Total: 846
  - Density: 12.6/km^{2} (32.6/sq mi)
- Time zone: UTC+09:00 (JST)
- City hall address: 2008-1 Shinjō-son, Maniwa-gun, Okayama-ken 717-0201
- Website: Official website
- Symbols
- Flower: Sakura
- Tree: Cryptomeria

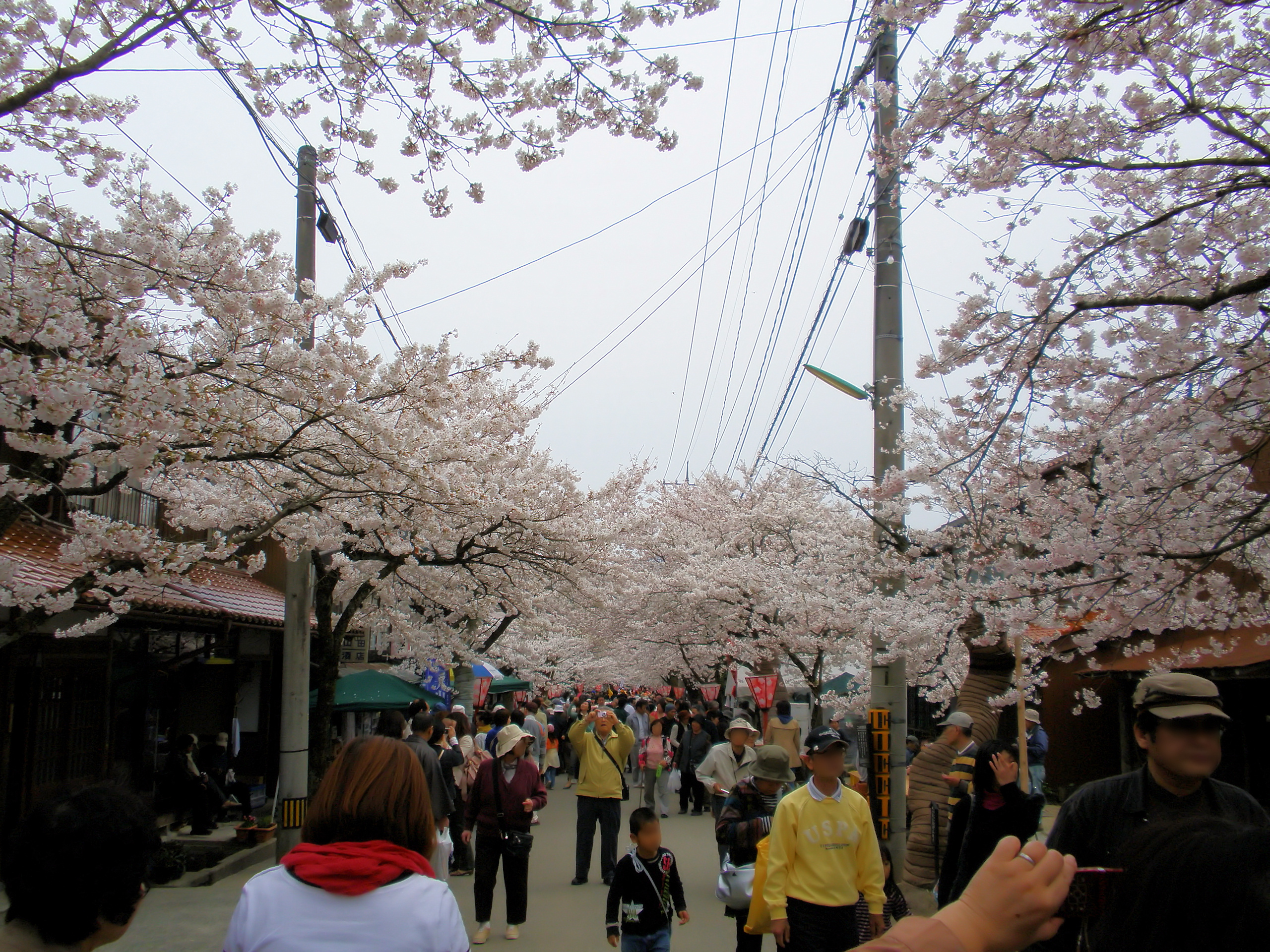
Triumphal return Cherry Blossom Street

Shinjō (新庄村, Shinjō-son) is a village located in Maniwa District, Okayama Prefecture, Japan. As of 30 November 2022, the village had an estimated population of 847 in 378 households and a population density of 13 persons per km^{2}. The total area of the village is 67.11 square kilometres (25.91 sq mi). It is a member of The Most Beautiful Villages in Japan Association.

== Geography ==
Shinjō is located in the north central part of Okayama Prefecture, separated from Tottori Prefecture to the north by the Chugoku Mountains. Mountains and forests occupy most of the village area].

=== Neighboring municipalities ===
Okayama Prefecture

- Maniwa
- Niimi

Tottori Prefecture

- Hino
- Kōfu

== Climate ==
Shinjō has a humid subtropical climate (Köppen Cfa) characterized by warm summers and cold winters with heavy snowfall. The average annual temperature in Shinjō is 11.4 °C. The average annual rainfall is 1883 mm with September as the wettest month. The temperatures are highest on average in January, at around 23.3 °C, and lowest in January, at around -0.5 °C.

== Demography ==
Per Japanese census data, the population of Shinjō has been as follows. The population has been steadily declining since the 1950s.

Historical population
Year	Pop.	±%
1920	1,742	—
1930	1,909	+9.6%
1940	1,709	−10.5%
1950	2,214	+29.5%
1960	1,968	−11.1%
1970	1,404	−28.7%
1980	1,357	−3.3%
1990	1,165	−14.1%
2000	1,051	−9.8%
2010	957	−8.9%

== History ==
Shinjō is part of ancient Mimasaka Province. After the Meiji restoration, the area was organized into Shinjō village with the creation of the modern municipalities system on June 1, 1889.

== Government ==
Shinjō has a mayor-council form of government with a directly elected mayor and a unicameral village council eight members. Shinjō, collectively with the city of Maniwa, contributes one member to the Okayama Prefectural Assembly. In terms of national politics, the village is part of the Okayama 3rd district of the lower house of the Diet of Japan.

== Economy ==
The main economic activity in the area is forestry and agriculture. Shinjō grows a variety of rice called hime no mochi. This rice is used to make the mochi rice cakes for which this town is also known. The hime no mochi factory is a major employer in Shinjō.

== Education ==
Shinjō has one public elementary school and one public junior high school operated by the village government. The village does not have a high school.

== Transportation ==
=== Railway ===
The village does not have any passenger railway service. The nearest train station is Neu Station on then JR West Hakubi Line in Hino, Tottori or Chūgoku-Katsuyama Station on the Kishin Line in Maniwa, Okayama.

=== Highways ===
- National Route 181

== Local attractions ==
This village is known for the cherry trees along its main street, which is called Triumphal return Cherry Blossom Street (がいせん桜通り, Gaisen sakura dōri). These trees were planted to celebrate the Japanese victory over Russia in the Russo-Japanese War in 1905. There are many old buildings along Victory Cherry Blossom Street. Many of these buildings used to be in that were built to accommodate the sankin kōtai mandatory processions of daimyō from their domains to the capital and back.
