= Japan National Route 181 =

Road in Japan

National Route 181
- 国道181号
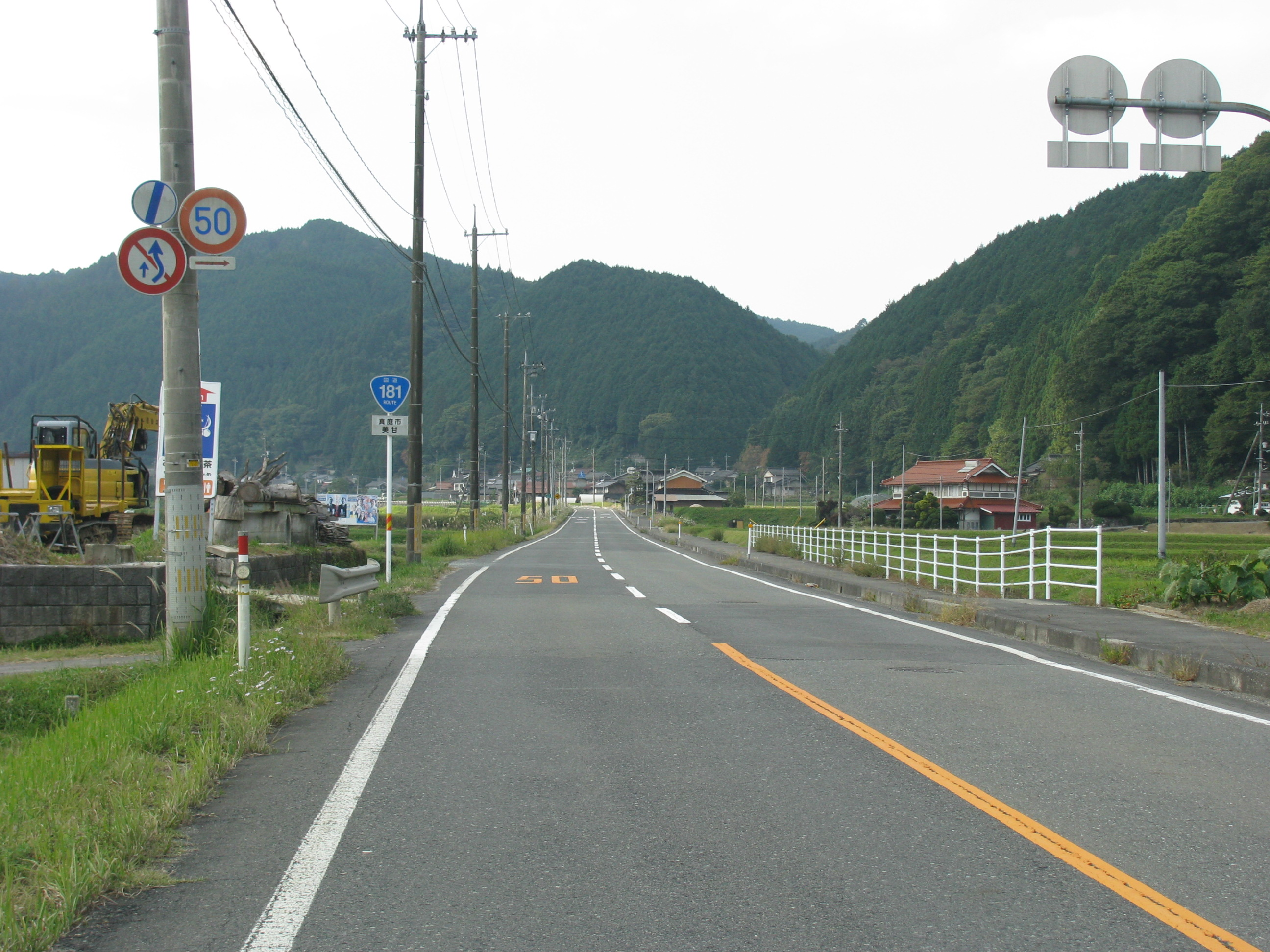

Route information
- Length: 101.8 km (63.3 mi)
- Existed: 18 May 1953–present

Major junctions
- North end: National Route 9 in Yonago
- South end: National Route 179 in Tsuyama

Location
- Country: Japan

Highway system
- National highways of Japan; Expressways of Japan
← National Route 180	→ National Route 182

National Route 181 is a national highway of Japan connecting Tsuyama and Yonago in Japan, with a total length of 101.8 km (63.26 mi).
