= Prefectural road =

Locally maintained road in Japan

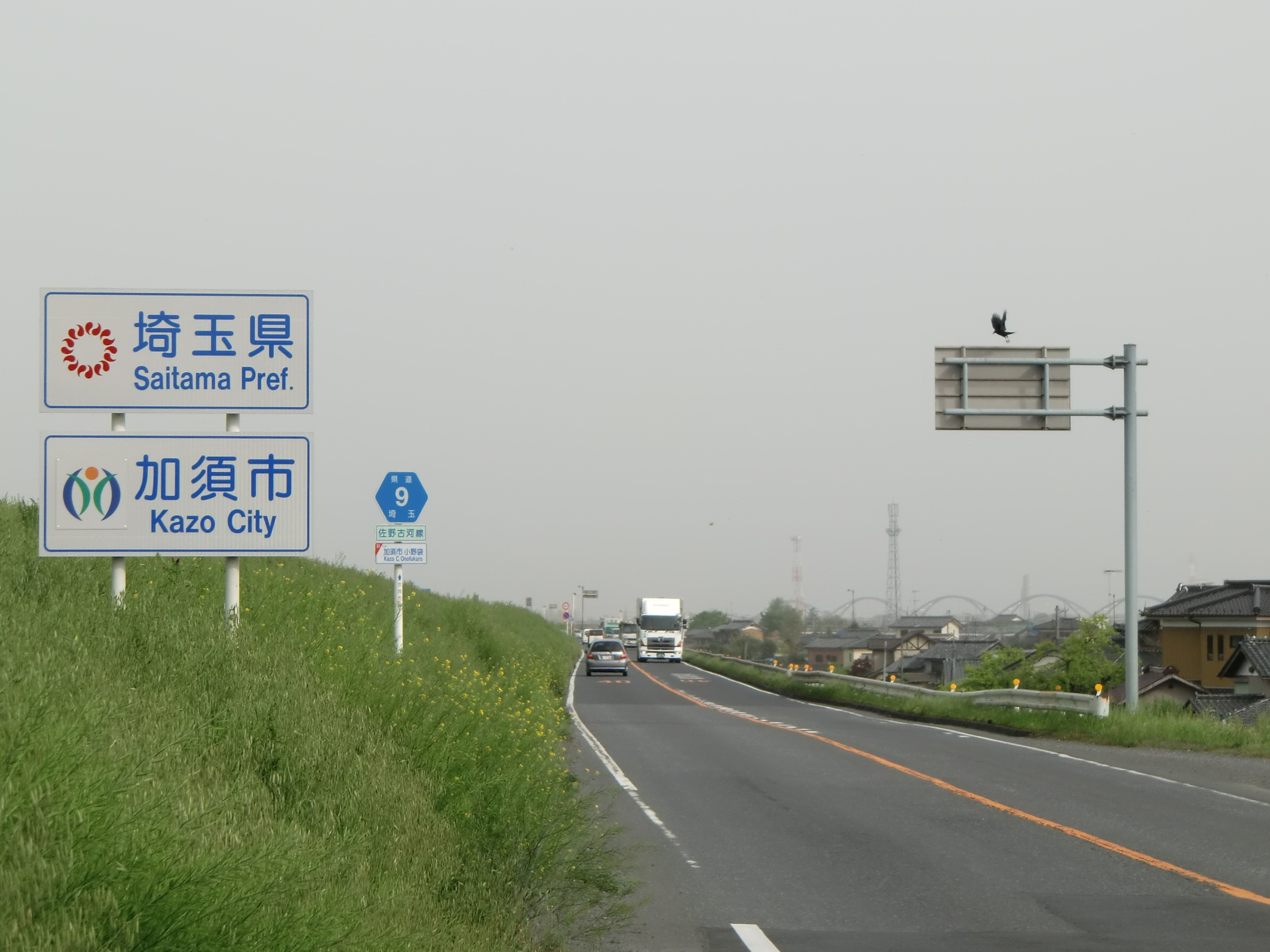
Prefectural and municipal border signs and road number sign on the Saitama Prefectural Road 9 (Saitama-kendō 9[-gō], 埼玉県道9[号])

Prefectural roads (都道府県道, todōfukendō; singular depending on the type of prefecture: todō, dōdō, fudō or kendō) in Japan are roads usually planned, numbered and maintained by the government of the respective prefecture (-to, -dō, -fu or -ken).

== Designation ==
Prefectural roads are planned, numbered and maintained independently of other prefectures – as opposed to national roads (kokudō), which in legal terms include national expressways (kōsoku jidōsha kokudō), and municipal roads ([ku]shichōsondō).

Where a national or prefectural road runs through the territory of a designated major city, the city government assumes part of the responsibility for these roads. By length, 10.7 % of public roads in Japan were prefectural roads as of 2011; by usage, they carried more than 30% of all traffic volume on public roads as of 2007.

Some prefectural roads will at times run for a short distance concurrent with a national route, but it is more common to see this with other prefectural roads.

Most usually end at another prefectural road, or national route, or occasionally at or very close to a Japan Railway station.

== Signage and numbering ==
Prefectural roads are marked with a blue hexagon, with the number centered.

Numbers are used only once in each prefecture, regardless of where the road begins or ends. If a prefectural road crosses into another prefecture, its number is not necessarily reused by the prefecture it crosses into, but many prefectural roads running through multiple prefectures are coordinated to share a number. For example, the "Fuchū-Sagamihara Line" (fuchuu-sagamihara-sen, 府中相模原線), which connects Fuchū City in Tokyo and Sagamihara City in Kanagawa Prefecture, starts as Tokyo Prefectural Road 20 but ends as Kanagawa Prefectural Road 525, while the "Sano-Koga line" (sano-koga-sen, 佐野古河線), which connects Sano City in Tochigi Prefecture and Koga City in Ibaraki Prefecture, is continually designated as Prefectural Road 9 in all four prefectures it runs through, namely Tochigi, Gunma, Saitama and Ibaraki.

Numbers used for national routes that run through a prefecture are often duplicated by prefectural routes but a national route and a prefectural route bearing the same number rarely if ever meet or cross each other.

== See also ==
- National highways of Japan
- Expressways of Japan
