= List of places of scenic beauty of Japan (Okayama) =

This list is of the places of scenic beauty of Japan located within the Prefecture of Okayama.

== National Places of Scenic Beauty ==
As of 1 June 2026, twelve Places have been designated at a national level (including one *Special Place of Scenic Beauty).

Site	Municipality	Comments	Image	Coordinates	Type	Ref.
*Kōraku-en 岡山後楽園; Okayama Kōraku-en	Okayama			34°40′05″N 133°56′06″E	1	
Okutsukei 奥津渓; Okutsukei	Kagamino			35°12′49″N 133°54′54″E	3, 6, 10	
Mount Ōjin 応神山; Ōjin-san	Kasaoka			34°30′20″N 133°31′13″E	11	
Shimotsui Mount Washū 下津井鷲羽山; Shimotsui Washū-zan	Kurashiki			34°26′06″N 133°48′40″E	11	
Onigatake 鬼ヶ嶽; Onigatake	Ibara, Yakage			34°41′46″N 133°35′35″E	5, 6	
Former Tsuyama Domain Villa Gardens (Shūraku-en) 旧津山藩別邸庭園（衆楽園） Kyū-Tsuyama-han bettei teien (Shūraku-en)	Tsuyama			35°04′18″N 134°00′22″E	1	
Takashima 高島; Takashima	Kasaoka			34°25′48″N 133°30′46″E	8, 11	
Gōkei 豪渓; Gōkei	Sōja, Kibichūō			34°45′31″N 133°42′08″E	5, 6	
Kanba Falls 神庭瀑; Kanba-baku	Maniwa			35°07′08″N 133°40′43″E	6	
Shiraishi Island 白石島; Shiraishi-jima	Kasaoka			34°24′40″N 133°31′17″E	8, 11	
Iwaya Valley 磐窟谷; Iwaya-dani	Takahashi			34°45′43″N 133°26′58″E	6	
Raikyū-ji Gardens 頼久寺庭園; Raikyū-ji teien	Takahashi			34°47′50″N 133°37′08″E	1	

== Prefectural Places of Scenic Beauty ==
As of 1 April 2026, nine Places have been designated at a prefectural level.

Site	Municipality	Comments	Image	Coordinates	Type	Ref.
Omizu-en 近水園; Omizu-en	Okayama			35°46′39″N 139°53′56″E		
Entsu-ji Park 円通寺公園; Entsuji kōen	Kurashiki			34°32′25″N 133°39′43″E		
Dōsokei 道祖渓; Dōsokei	Ibara			34°38′01″N 133°29′19″E		
Tenjin-kyō 天神峡; Tenjin-kyō	Ibara			34°38′40″N 133°25′25″E		
Mount Yataka 弥高山; Mount Yataka	Takahashi			34°44′09″N 133°24′34″E		
Daitsū-ji Gardens 大通寺庭園; Daitsūji teien	Yakage			34°38′24″N 133°34′21″E		
Ryūjō-in Gardens 龍城院庭園; Ryūjō-in teien	Asakuchi			34°29′38″N 133°34′43″E		
Meoto Iwa 夫婦岩; Meoto-iwa	Takahashi			34°47′38″N 133°27′06″E		
Myōkyō-ji Gardens (Kanshō-tei) 妙教寺庭園(寒松庭); Myōkyō-ji teien (Kanshō-tei)	Okayama			34°42′33″N 133°50′00″E		

== Municipal Places of Scenic Beauty ==
As of 1 May 2025, thirty-six Places have been designated at a municipal level.

== Registered Places of Scenic Beauty ==
As of 19 June 2026, three Monuments have been registered (as opposed to designated) as Places of Scenic Beauty at a national level.

Place	Municipality	Comments	Image	Coordinates	Type	Ref.
Former Kajimura Family Gardens 旧梶村氏庭園 kyū-Kajimura-shi teien	Tsuyama			35°03′48″N 134°01′01″E		
Shimizu Family Gardens 清水氏庭園; Shimizu-shi teien	Kasaoka			34°30′46″N 133°29′04″E		
Okayama University Campus Gardens 岡山大学構内(旧歩兵隊将校集会所)庭園; Okayama Daigaku kōnai (kyū-hohei taishō kōshū kaijo) teien	Okayama	laid out before the war as part of a facility for army officers				

== See also ==
- Cultural Properties of Japan
- List of parks and gardens of Okayama Prefecture
- List of Historic Sites of Japan (Okayama)
- List of Cultural Properties of Japan – paintings (Okayama)
