= Gōkei Station =

Railway station in Sōja, Okayama Prefecture, Japan

Gōkei Station 豪渓駅
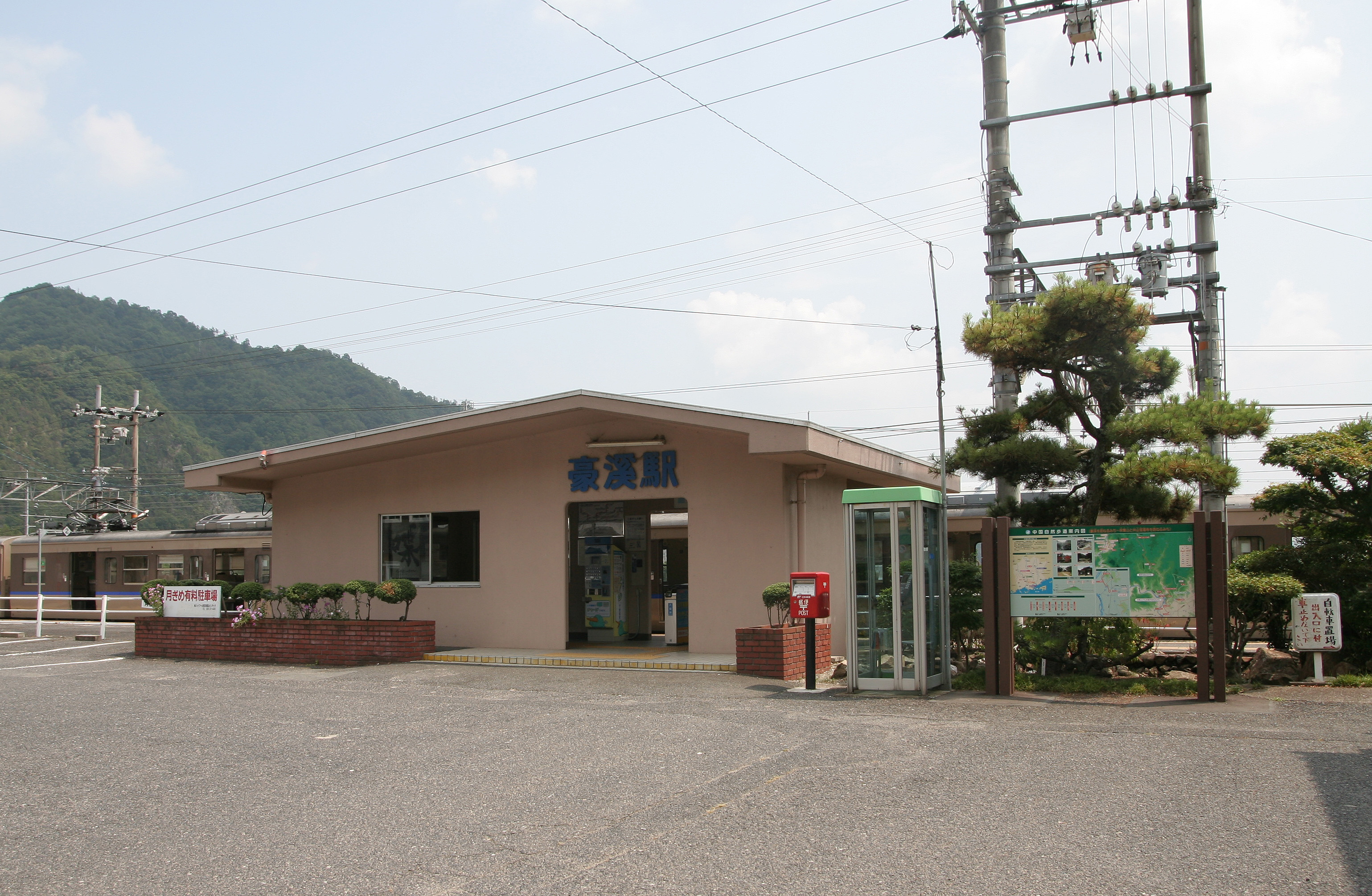
- Gōkei Station, August 2008

General information
- Location: 362-2 Shisawa, Sōja-shi, Okayama-ken 719-1153; Japan
- Coordinates: 34°42′23.07″N 133°43′21.09″E
- Operator: JR West
- Line: V Hakubi Line
- Distance: 15.3 km (9.5 miles) from Kurashiki
- Platforms: 1 side + 1 island platforms
- Tracks: 3

Other information
- Status: Unstaffed
- Station code: JR-V08
- Website: Official website

History
- Opened: 17 February 1925

Passengers
- 2019: 131 daily
Location
- Location within Okayama Prefecture Location within Japan

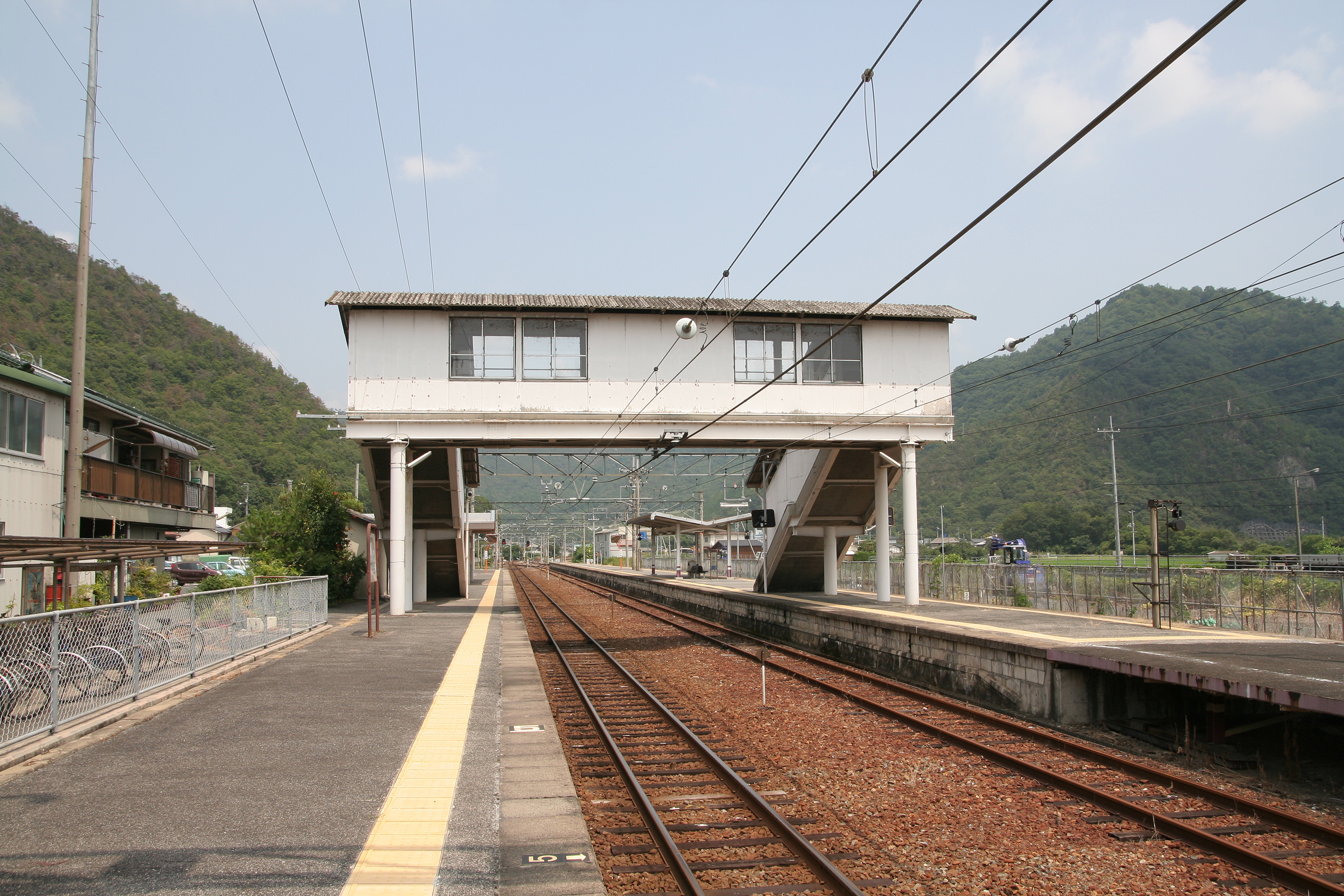
enclosure(2008-08-06).

Gōkei Station (豪渓駅, Gōkei-eki) is a passenger railway station located in the city of Sōja, Okayama Prefecture, Japan. It is operated by the West Japan Railway Company (JR West). The station is named after the Gōkei area, a scenic valley about 8 km north of the station.

== Lines ==
Gōkei Station is served by the Hakubi Line, and is located 15.3 kilometers from the terminus of the line at Kurashiki and 31.2 kilometers from Okayama.

== Station layout ==
The station consists of a ground-level side platform and an island platforms connected to the wooden station building by a footbridge. The station is unattended.

=== Platforms ===
1	■ V Hakubi Line	for Kurashiki and Okayama
2, 3	■ V Hakubi Line	for Niimi and Yonago

== Adjacent stations ==
«	Service	»
Hakubi Line
Sōja	-	Hiwa

== History ==
Gōkei Station opened on February 17, 1925 as Shisawa Station (宍粟駅). It was renamed on May 16, 1935. With the privatization of the Japan National Railways (JNR) on April 1, 1987, the station came under the aegis of the West Japan Railway Company.

== Passenger statistics ==
In fiscal 2019, the station was used by an average of 131 passengers daily.

== Surrounding area ==
The area near Gōkei Station is fairly flat and open as most of the housing in the area is not located directly around the station. The Gōkei Police Station and Gōkei Post office are located near the station. The Takahashi River is located across Japan National Route 180, about 200m southeast of Gōkei Station.

- Japan National Route 180
- Okayama Prefectural Route 57 (Sōja-Kayō Route)
- Okayama Prefectural Route 278 (Shisawa-Mabi Route)

== See also ==
- List of railway stations in Japan
