= Shūraku-en =

Garden in Tsuyama, Japan

- 衆楽園
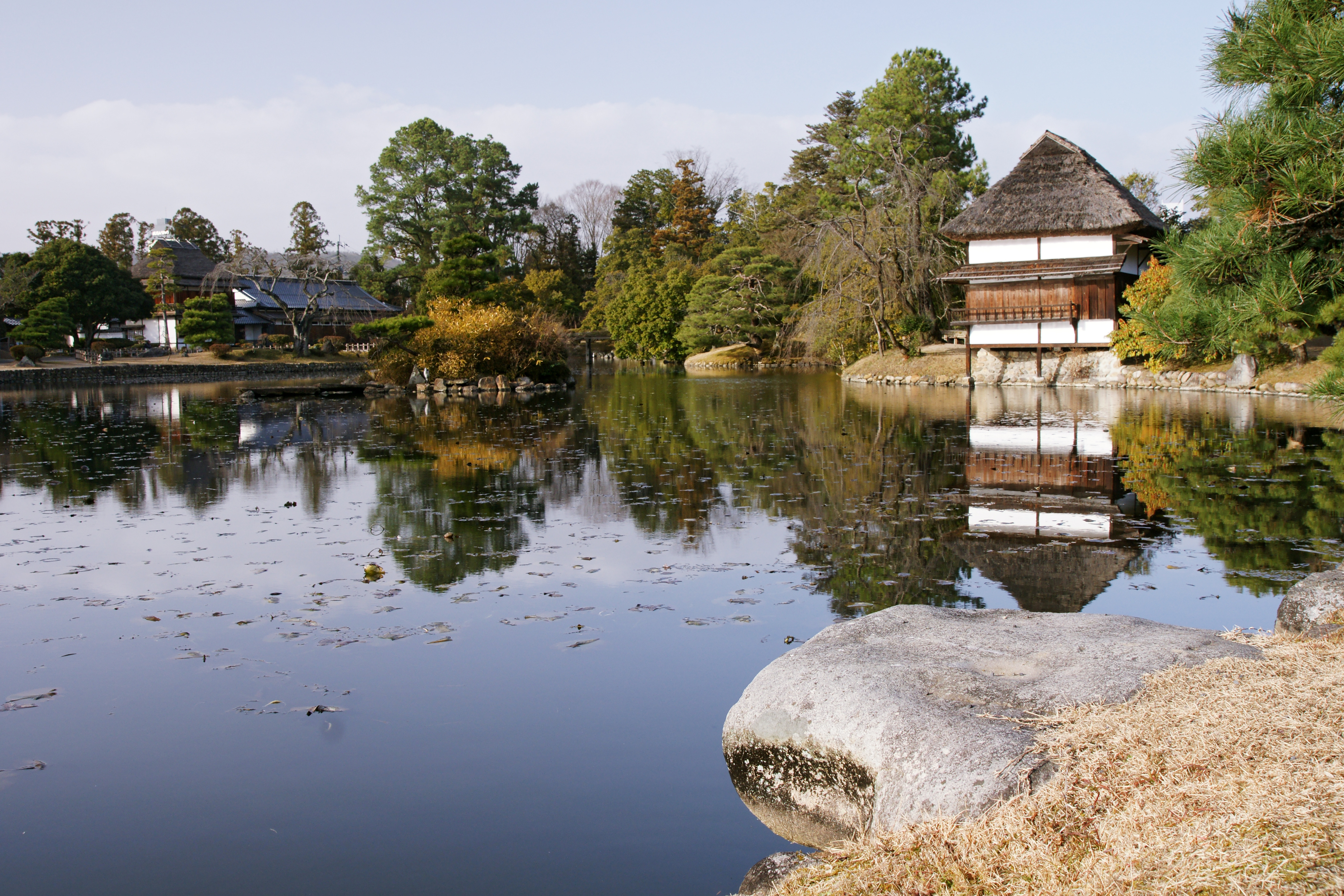
- Shūraku-en

- Location within Okayama Prefecture Location within Japan
- Type: Urban park
- Location: Tsuyama, Okayama, Japan
- Coordinates: 35°04′19″N 134°00′22″E
- Area: 28,000 square metres (6.9 acres)
- Created: 1655-1658
- Operator: Tsuyama city
- Status: Open to public
- National Palace of Scenic Beauty

Shūraku-en (衆楽園, Shūrakuen) is a Japanese garden located in the city of Tsuyama, Okayama Prefecture, Japan. Shūraku-en was built in 1658 by Mori Nagatsugu, daimyō of Tsuyama Domain.

== History ==
Mori Nagatsugu invited gardeners of the Kobori Enshū school from Kyoto to create a daimyō garden with a walking path around a pond, based on the gardens of the Sento Imperial Palace of the Kyoto Imperial Palace. Construction work was from 1655 to 1658, and the resultant garden covered 74,700 square metres (18.5 acres) (256 meters from east-to-west by 292 meters form north-to-south), or approximately three times the size of the surviving portion of the garden today. Under the Matsudaira clan, who succeeded the Mori clan as rulers of Tsuyama, the garden was used as the Gotaimenjo (御対面所) for audiences or diplomacy. None of the buildings from the Edo period remain. The garden was given the name "Shūraku-en" in 1870.

Most of the garden is occupied by a long pond in the north-south direction, with four islands. With the Chugoku Mountains to the north as borrowed scenery, the pond in the north is placed so as to be approached by artificial hills in the east and north, and a 210-meter-long winding stream flows on the east side. There are few artificial structures such as tōrō lanterns, as the characteristic of the garden is that it is integrated with nature. The present buildings along the shore of the pond are all reconstructions. Shūraku-en was designated a Place of Scenic Beauty (名勝, meishō) by the national government in 2002. It is open to the public free as a citizen's park. However, it is closed at night.

== Gallery ==
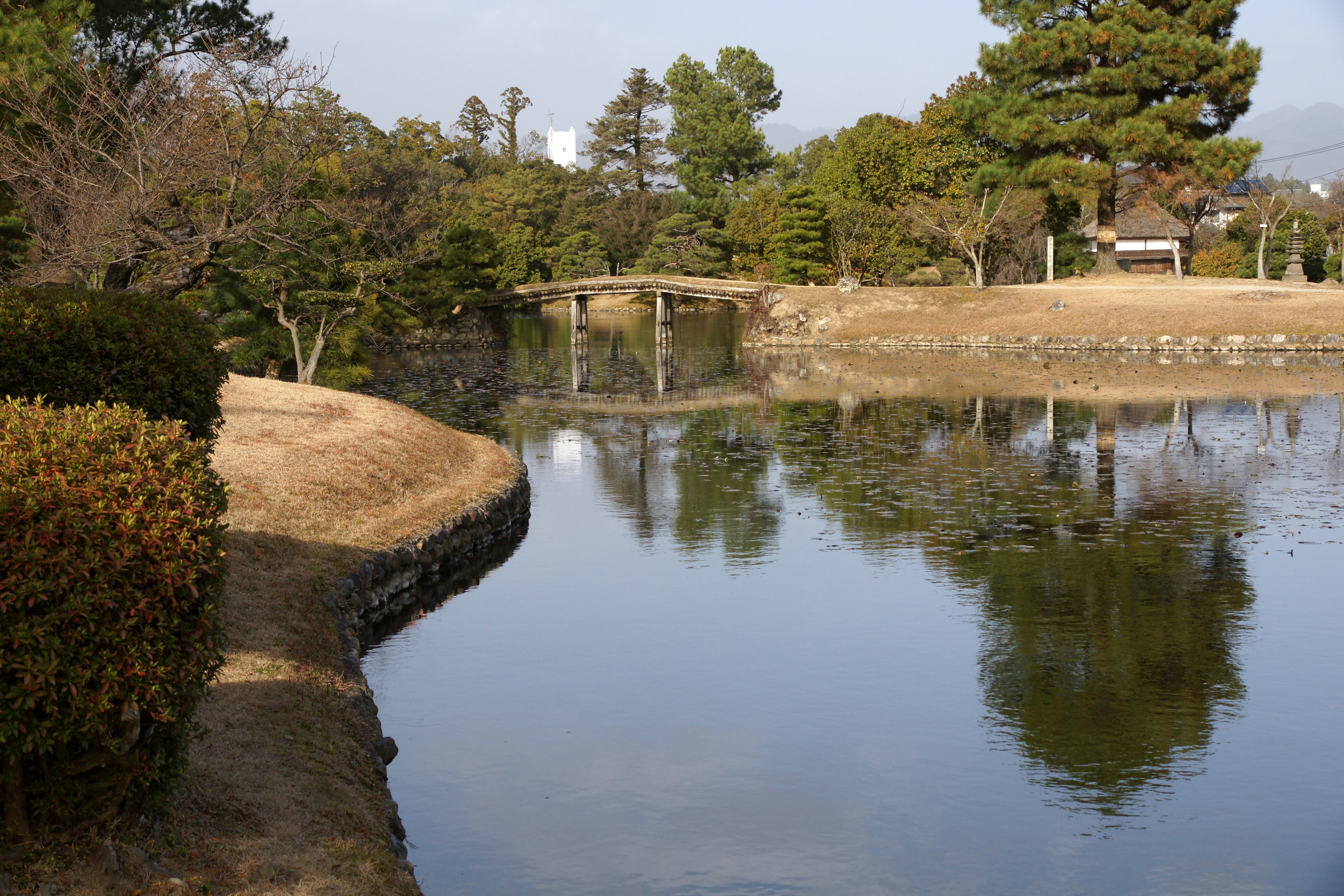
Southern aspect of the pond

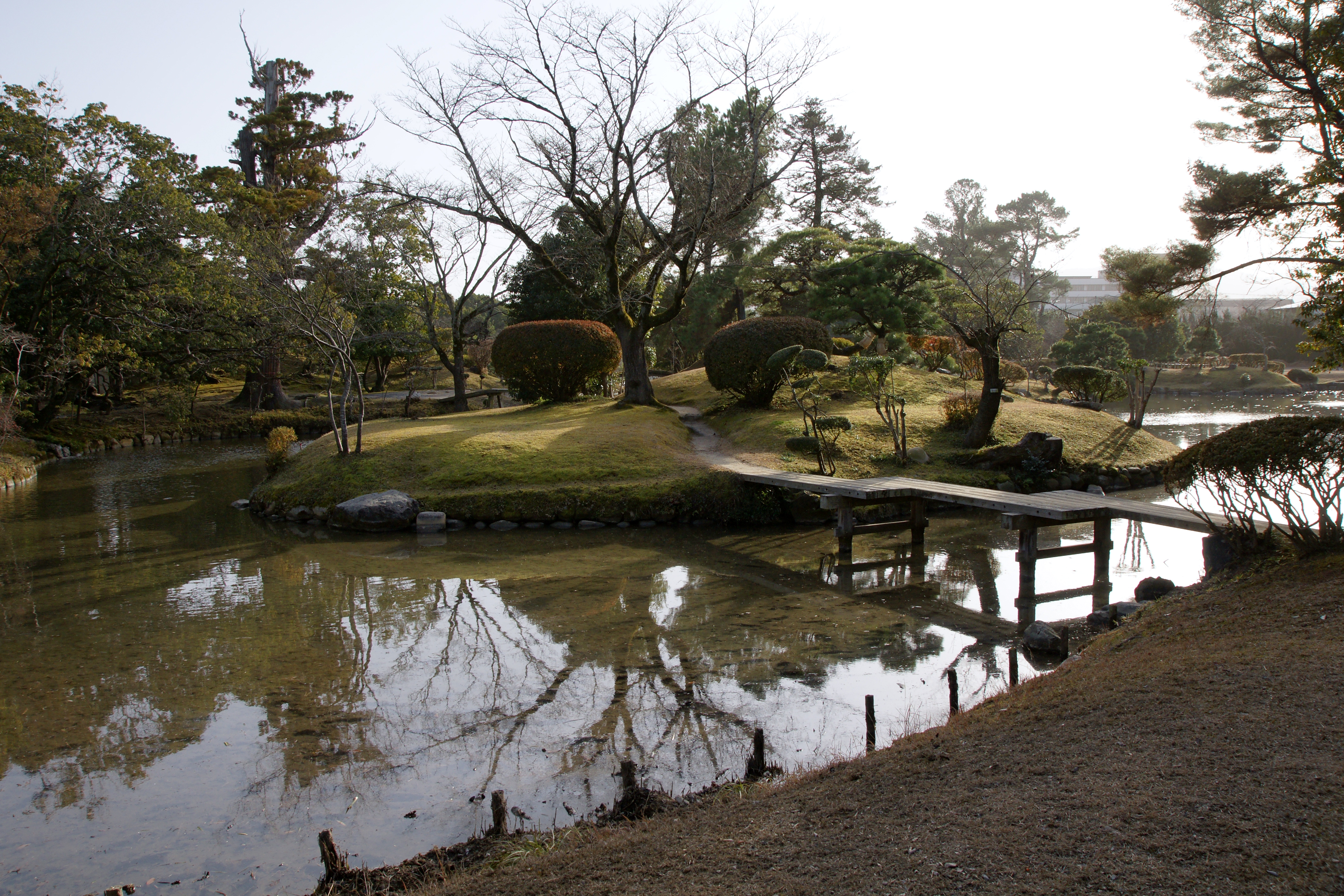
Naka-no-shima

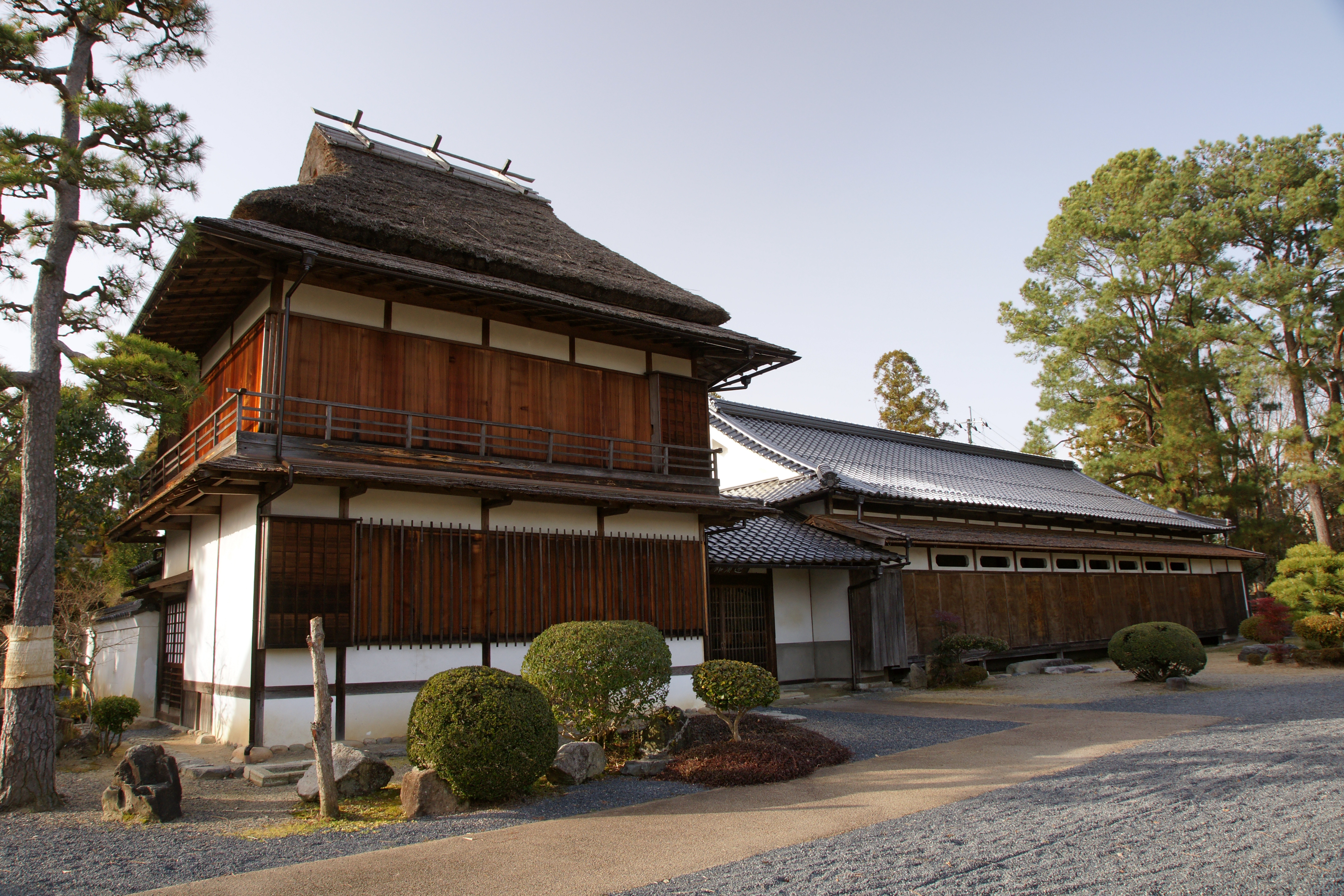
Yohokaku and Geihinkan pavilions

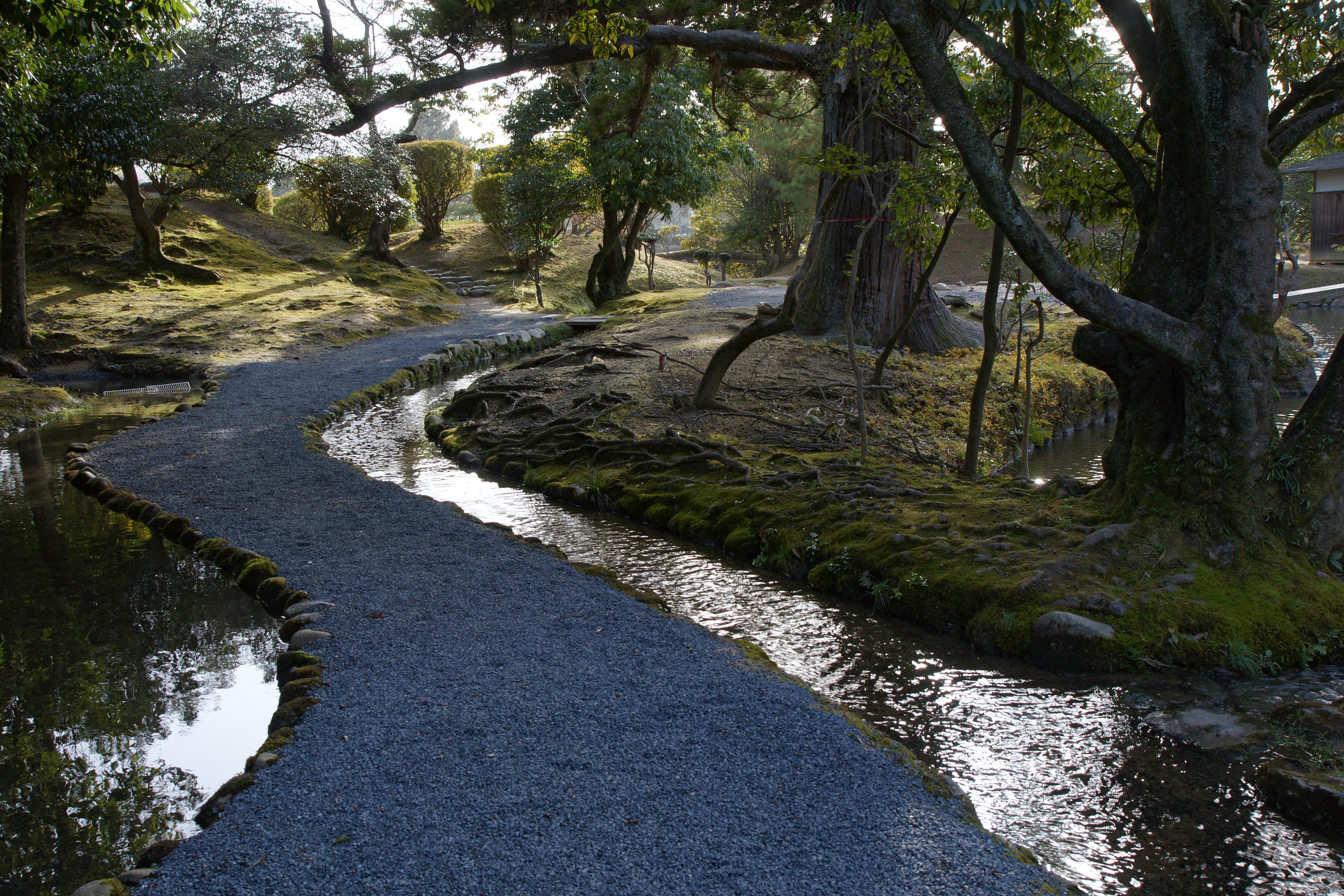
the stream

== See also ==
- List of Places of Scenic Beauty of Japan (Okayama)
- Tsuyama Castle
- Tsuyama Domain
