= Nadasaki, Okayama =

Dissolved municipality in Okayama prefecture, Japan

Nadasaki (灘崎町, Nadasaki-chō) was a town located in Kojima District, Okayama Prefecture, Japan.

As of 2003, the town had an estimated population of 15,872 and a density of 514.32 persons per km^{2}. The total area was 30.86 km^{2}.

On March 22, 2005, Nadasaki, along with the town of Mitsu (from Mitsu District), was merged into the expanded city of Okayama.
