= Kaga District, Okayama =

District in Okayama prefecture, Japan

Coordinates: 34.869°N 133.745°E

Location of Kaga District in Okayama Prefecture

Kaga (加賀郡, Kaga-gun) is a district located in Okayama Prefecture, Japan.

As of 2020 the district has an estimated population of 10,886 and a population density of 40.50 persons per km^{2}. The total area is 268.8 km^{2}.

== Towns and villages ==
- Kibichūō - Merger of two towns: Kamogawa from Mitsu District, and Kayō from Jōbō District on October 1, 2004
