= Kamogawa, Okayama =

Dissolved municipality in Okayama prefecture, Japan

Kamogawa (加茂川町, Kamogawa-chō) was a town located in Mitsu District, Okayama Prefecture, Japan.

As of 2003, the town had an estimated population of 6,037 and a density of 42.77 persons per km^{2}. The total area was 141.15 km^{2}.

On October 1, 2004, Kamogawa, along with the town of Kayō (from Jōbō District), was merged to create the town of Kibichūō (in the newly created Kaga District).
