= Mitsu District, Okayama =

Former district in Okayama prefecture, Japan

Mitsu District (御津郡, Mitsu-gun) was a district located in Okayama Prefecture, Japan.

As of 2003, the district had an estimated population of 22,923. The total area was 345.10 km^{2}.

On April 1, 1900, the district was founded after the mergers of Mino and Tsudaka Districts.

== Towns and villages once part of the district ==
Due to the mergers, the following towns have been dissolved since the 1970s.

- Ichinomiya - Merged into the city of Okayama on January 8, 1971
- Tsudaka - Merged into the city of Okayama on January 8, 1971
- Kamogawa
- Mitsu
- Takebe

== Mergers ==
- On October 10, 2004 - the town of Kamogawa, along with the town of Kayō (from Jōbō District), was merged to create the town of Kibichūō. The new town belongs to the newly created Kaga District, founded upon this merger.
- On March 22, 2005 - the town of Mitsu, along with the town of Nadasaki (from Kojima District) was merged into the expanded city of Okayama.
- On January 22, 2007 - the town of Takebe, along with the town of Seto (from Akaiwa District), was merged into the expanded city of Okayama. Mitsu District was dissolved as a result of this merger.
