= Mitsu, Okayama =

Town in Mitsu District, Okayama Prefecture, Japan

Mitsu (御津町, Mitsu-chō) was a town located in Mitsu District, Okayama Prefecture, Japan.

As of 2003, the town had an estimated population of 10,124 and a density of 88.48 persons per km^{2}. The total area was 114.42 km^{2}.

On March 22, 2005, Mitsu, along with the town of Nadasaki (from Kojima District), was merged into the expanded city of Okayama.
