= Hiwa Station =

Railway station in Sōja, Okayama Prefecture, Japan

Hiwa Station 日羽駅
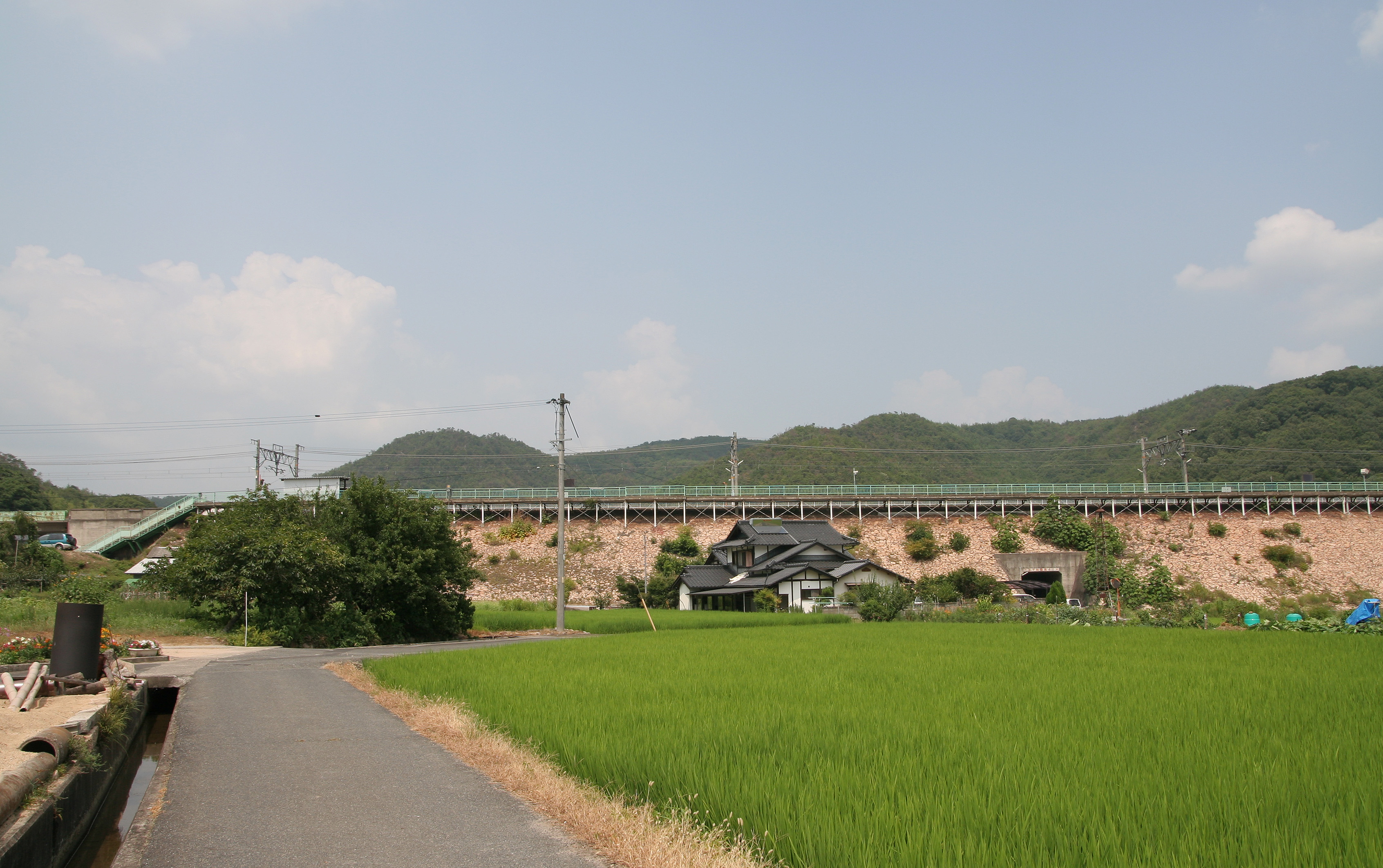
- Hiwa Station, August 2008

General information
- Location: Hiwa, Sōja-shi, Okayama-ken 719-1316; Japan
- Coordinates: 34°42′56.76″N 133°41′23.40″E
- Operator: JR West
- Line: V Hakubi Line
- Distance: 19.0 km (11.8 miles) from Kurashiki
- Platforms: 2 side platforms
- Tracks: 2

Other information
- Status: Unstaffed
- Station code: JR-V09
- Website: Official website

History
- Opened: 15 May 1956

Passengers
- 2019: 83 daily
Location
- Location within Okayama Prefecture Location within Japan

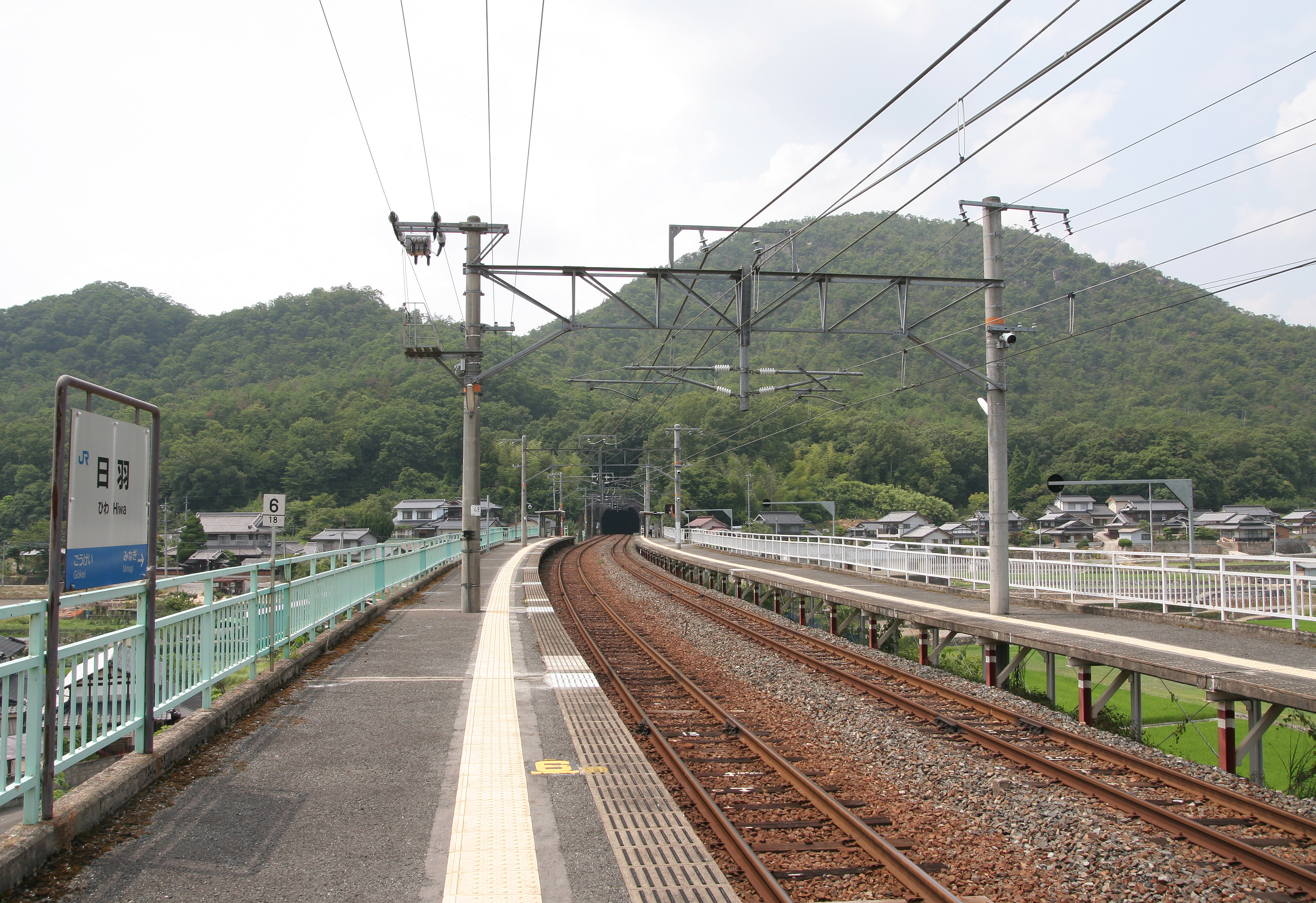
platforms(2008-08-06).

Hiwa Station (日羽駅, Hiwa-eki) is a passenger railway station located in the city of Sōja, Okayama Prefecture, Japan. It is operated by the West Japan Railway Company (JR West).

== Lines ==
Hiwa Station is served by the Hakubi Line, and is located 19.0 kilometers from the terminus of the line at Kurashiki and 34.9 kilometers from Okayama.

== Station layout ==
The station consists of two opposed side platforms located on an embankment. There is no connection between platforms, and any passengers wishing to change direction must exit the station and re-enter after passing through a tunnel under the embankment. There is a waiting shelter on each platform, but no station building and the station is unattended.

=== Platforms ===
1	■ V Hakubi Line	for Kurashiki and Okayama
2	■ V Hakubi Line	for Niimi and Yonago

== Adjacent stations ==
«	Service	»
Hakubi Line
Gōkei	-	Minagi

== History ==
Hiwa Station opened on May 15, 1956. With the privatization of the Japan National Railways (JNR) on April 1, 1987, the station came under the aegis of the West Japan Railway Company.

== Passenger statistics ==
In fiscal 2019, the station was used by an average of 83 passengers daily.

== Surrounding area ==
The station is located in a valley between tunnels. There are thirteen Shinto shrines and four Buddhist temples within one kilometer of the station. The Hiwadani River, a tributary of the Takahashi River, flows out of the Hiwa Valley above the station, emptying into the Takahashi River near the station. The Okayama Sōja plant of Nikken Lease Kōgyō, one of Japan's largest industrial and commercial equipment and supplies leasing companies, is visible from the station.

- Takahashi River
- Japan National Route 180

== See also ==
- List of railway stations in Japan
