= Gōkei area =

Coordinates: 34.7612°N 133.7008°E

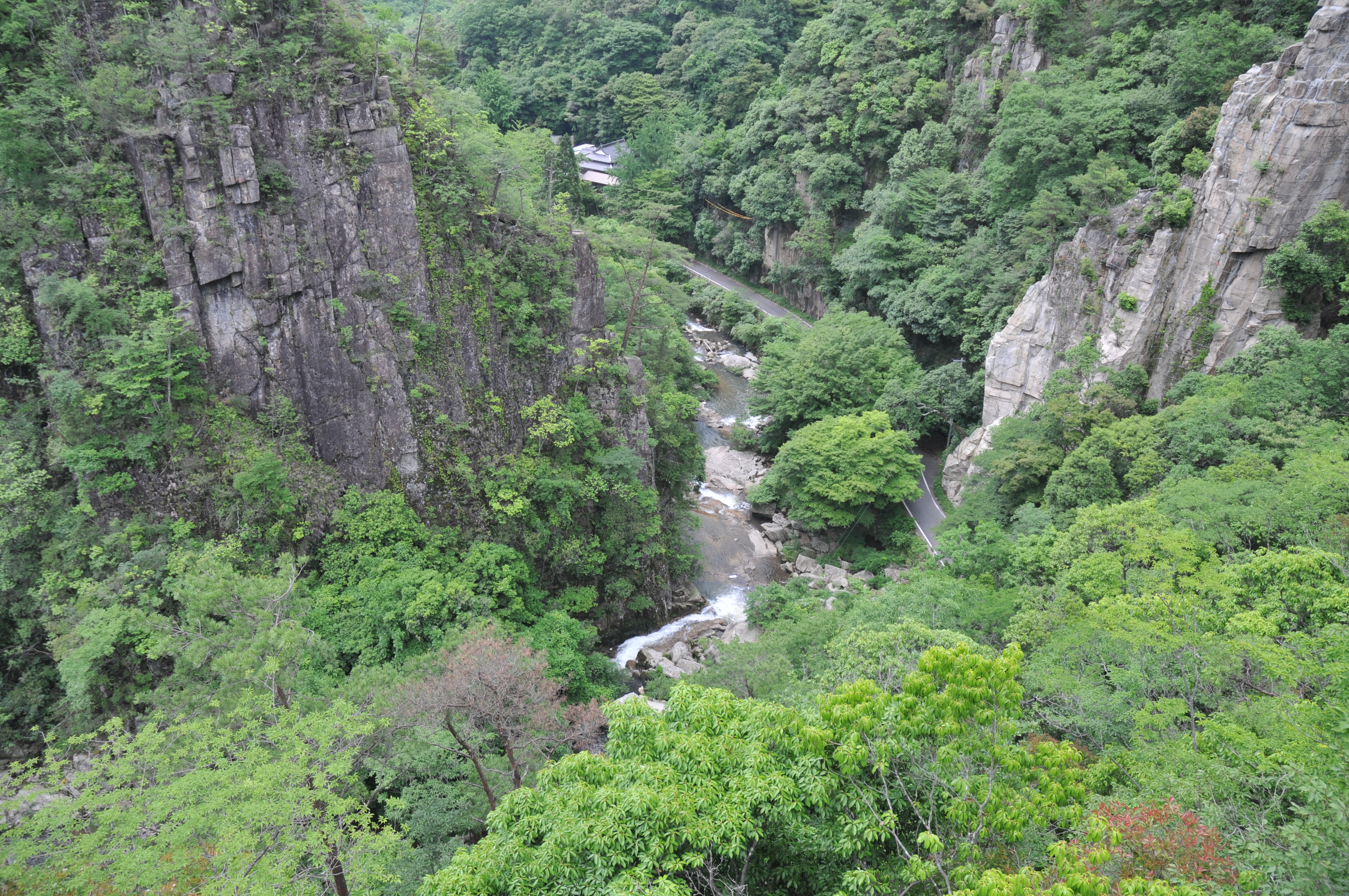

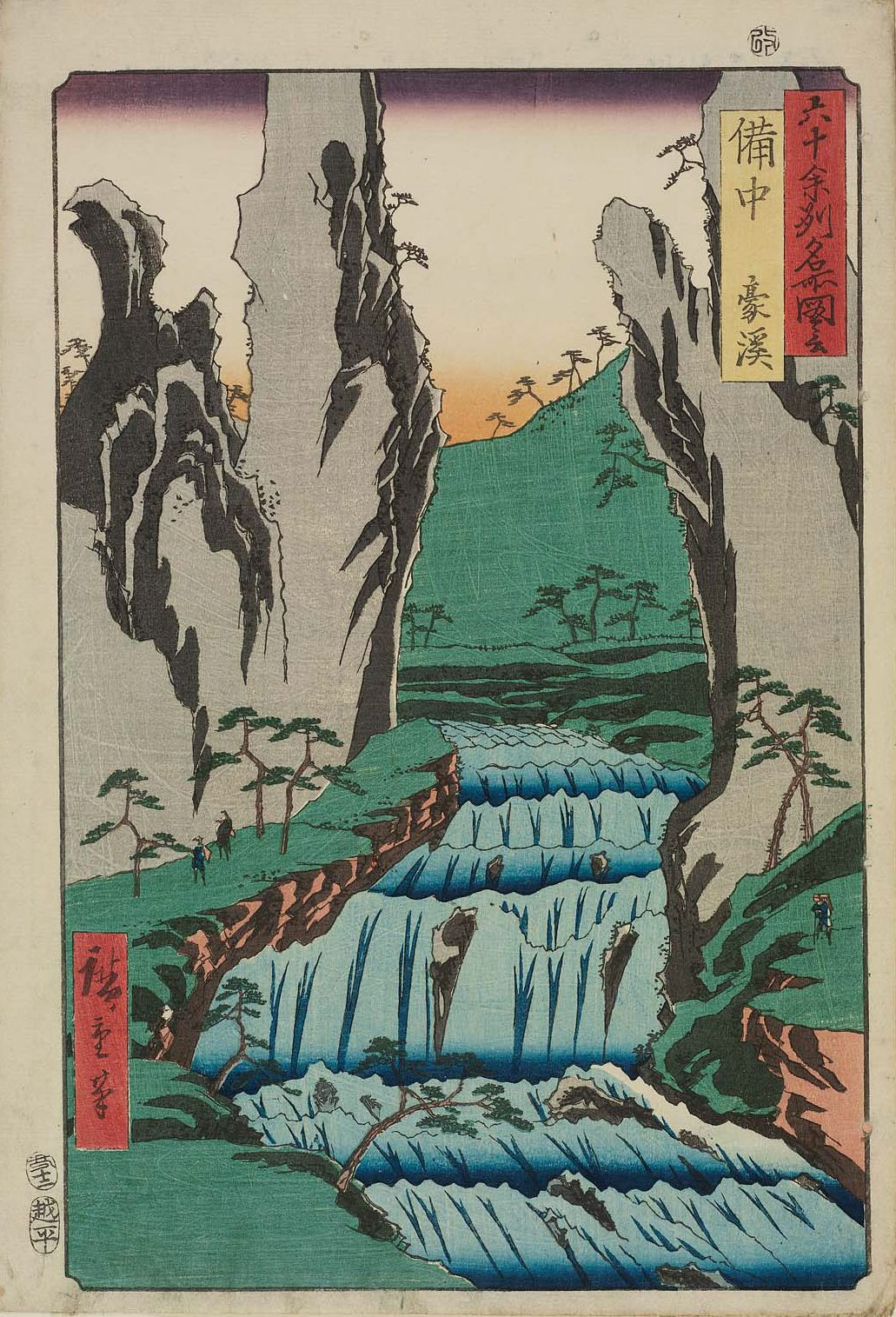
Hiroshige

The Gōkei area (豪渓, Gōkei) is a river valley formed by the Makidani River (a tributary of the Takahashi River) which stretched from the extreme northern part of Sōja to Kibichūō (formerly Kayō) in Okayama Prefecture, Japan. The area is only about 600m long, but the area is filled with strange granite rock formations resulting from wind and rain erosion. The area has become a local attraction for those wanting to view the scenic beauty and the strange formations, leading to its listing in 1923 as a national scenic spot in Japan.

Some well known spots of interest within the Gōkei area include the 330m high Ganpō (岩峰), Tenchūzan (天柱山), as well as Kengamine (剣峰) and Unate Mountain (雲梯山, Unatesan). The area is accessible via Okayama Prefectural Route 57 (also known as the Sōja-Kayō Route).

== See also ==
- Geology of Japan
