= Raikyū-ji =

Buddhist temple in Japan

- 頼久寺
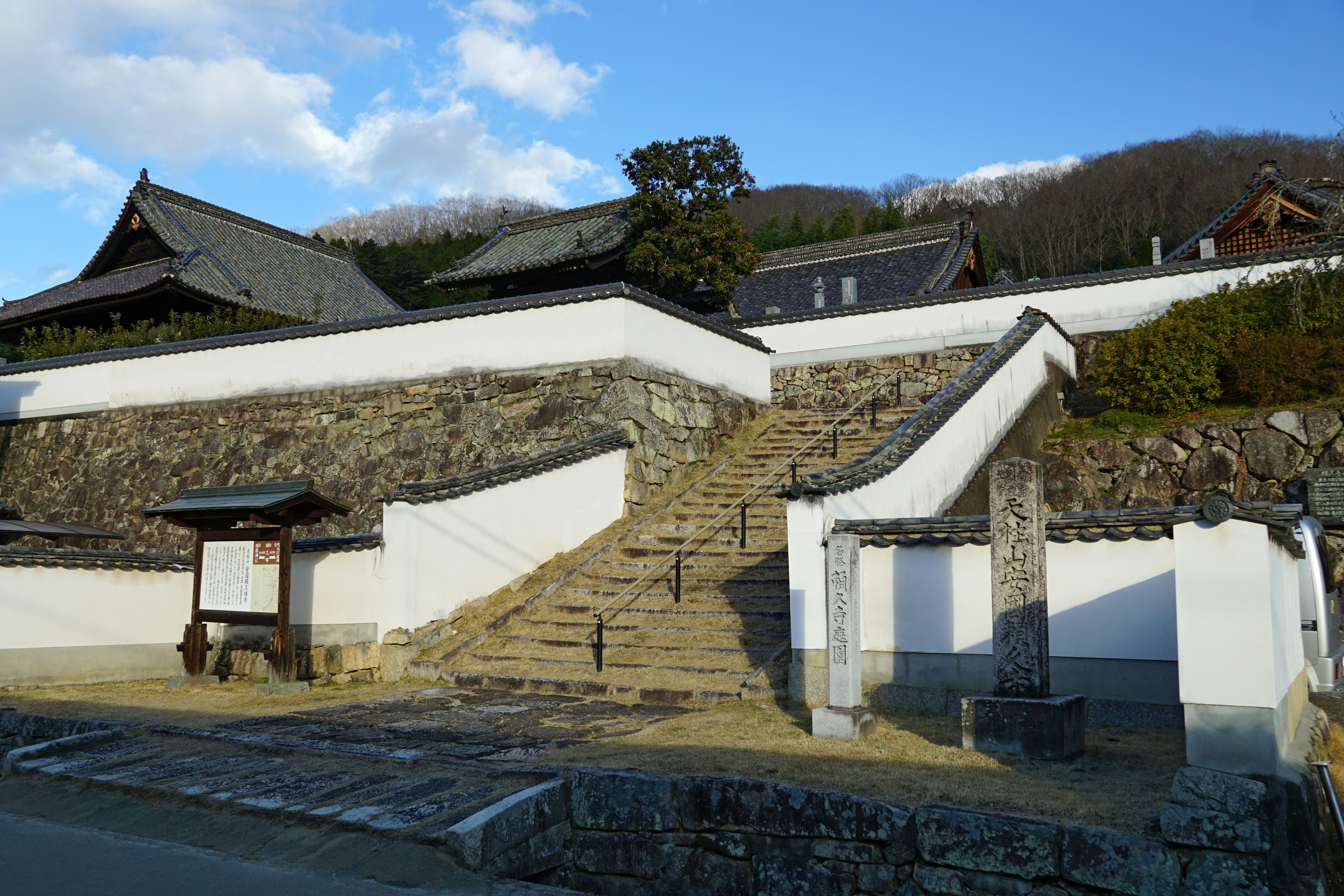
- Raikyū-ji entry

- Location within Okayama Prefecture Location within Japan

Religion
- Affiliation: Buddhist
- Deity: Kannon Bosatsu
- Rite: Rinzai school
- Status: functional

Location
- Location: 18 Raikyūcho, Takahashi-shi, Okayama-ken
- Country: Japan
- Interactive map of Raikyū-ji
- Coordinates: 34°47′50.7″N 133°37′8.2″E

Architecture
- Founder: unknown; restored 1339

Website
- Official website
- National Place of Scenic Beauty

Raikyū-ji (頼久寺) is a Buddhist temple located in the Raikyūcho neighborhood of the city of Takahashi, Okayama Prefecture, Japan. The temple's full name is Tenchū-zan Ankoku Raikyū-ji (天柱山安国頼久寺). It belongs to the Eigen-ji branch of Rinzai school of Japanese Buddhism, and its honzon is a statue of Kannon Bosatsu. It is known for its Japanese garden, which was designated a NationalPlace of Scenic Beauty in 1974, with the area under protection expanded in 2009 to include the Main Hall and Shoin of the temple.

== History ==
The early history and original name of the temple are unknown. It was revived in 1339 when Ashikaga Takauji designated it as the official Ankoku-ji temple dedicated to the memory of the dead of the Genkō War of 1331-3 for Bitchū Province. The priest who came to restore the temple and to convert it to a Zen establishment was Chuhō Minpon (中峰明本), from Hangzhou in Yuan China. During the Eishō era (1504–1521), the lord of Bitchū Matsuyama Castle, UenoYorihisa, took the tonsure at this temple, and after his death it was renamed for him, using the kanbun reading of the kanji "頼久", to become Raikyū-ji. His grave is at the temple. The temple also has the graves of three generations of the Bitchū Mimura clan] Mimura Iechika, who was assassinated by Ukita Naoie in 1566, his son Mimura Motochika, who committed seppuku after his defeat by the Mōri-Ukita coalition in 1575, and his son Shobōshi-maru, who was put to death by Kobayakawa Takakage. The temple was also destroyed during this war in 1575. Although rebuilt, it was completely destroyed again by fire in 1839, during which time most of its records were lost.

After the Battle of Sekigahara in 1600, Tokugawa Ieyasu assigned Kobori Masatsugu as daikan to administer confiscated easternmost part of the Mōri territory in Bitchū. Since this was tenryō territory, although the kokudaka was 14,000 koku, he was not regarded as a daimyō. After his death in 1604 son Kobori Masakazu (better known as Kobori Enshū) inherited the estate. At this time, Bitchū Matsuyama Castle was in ruins, so Masakazu conducted government affairs at Raikyū-ji until the caste reconstruction was completed in 1619. The garden at Raikyū-ji was designed and completed during this period. The garden combines elements of a dry garden with borrowed scenery of neighboring hills. The garden is also known as Tsurukame Garden on account of the two stone islands in the garden named "Crane" and "Tortoise" island respectively. Since it was completed in 1609, the abbots of the temple have maintained the garden in its original form.

The temple is located approximately 15 minus on foot from Bitchū Takahashi Station.

== Gallery ==
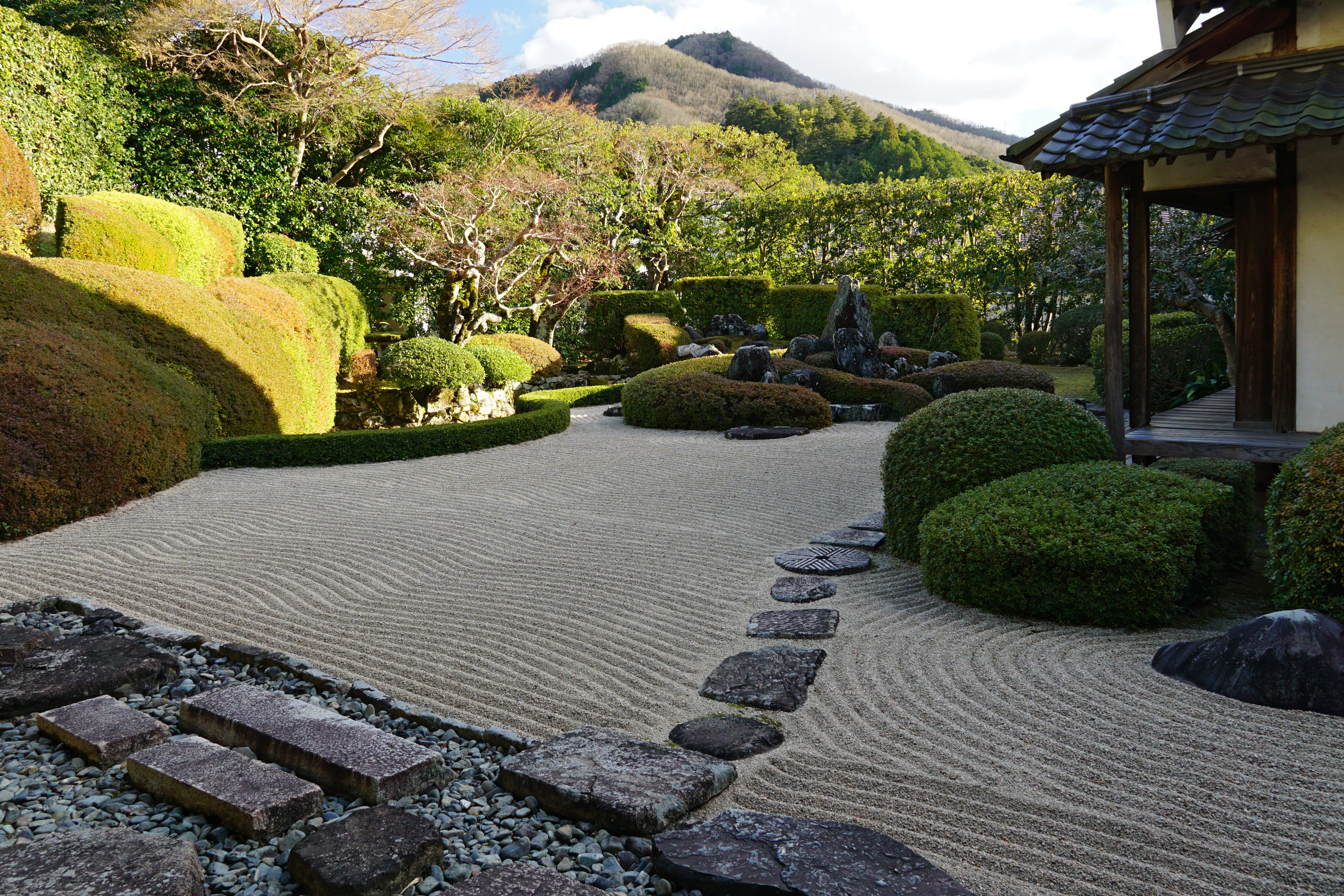
Gardens

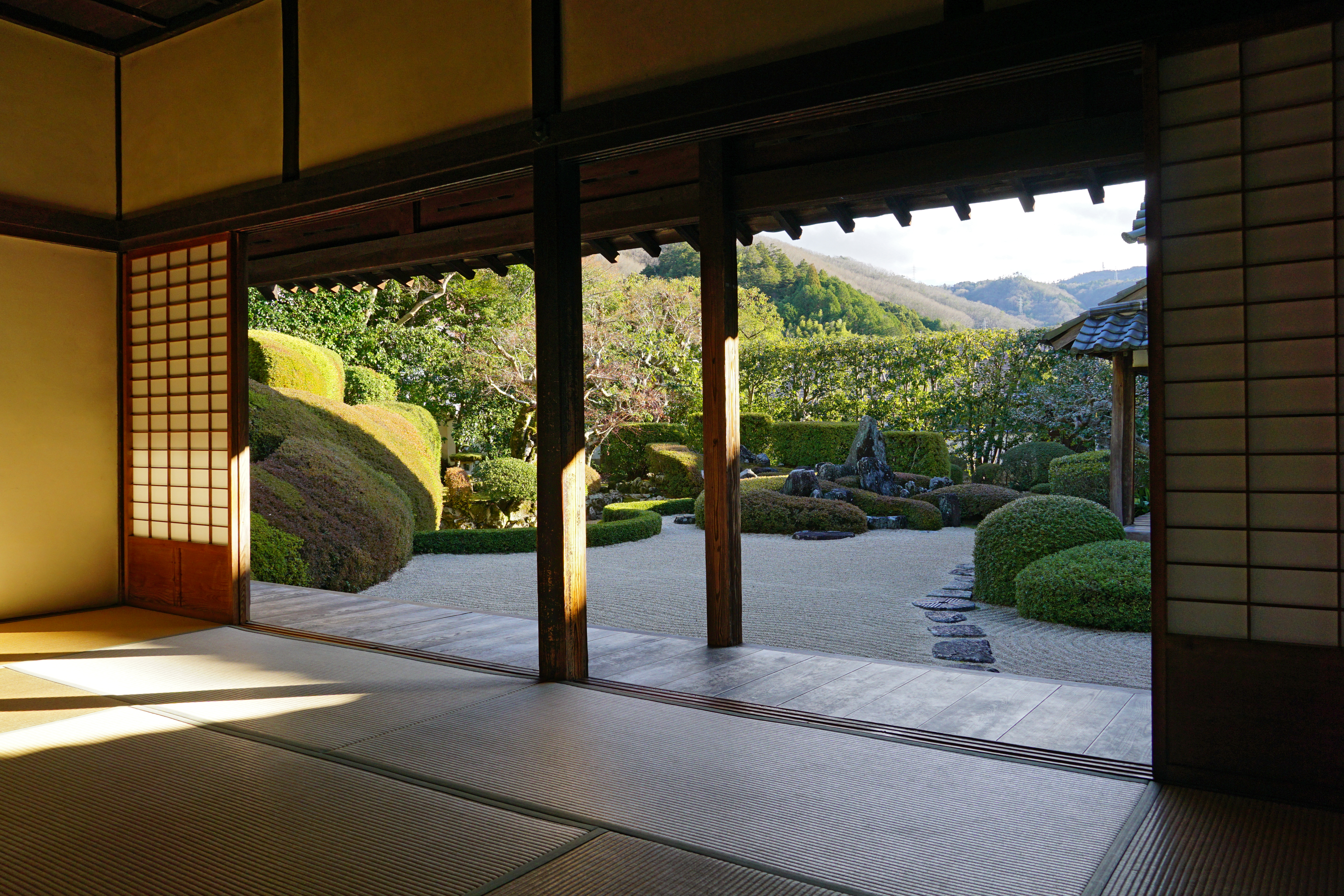
View from the Shoin

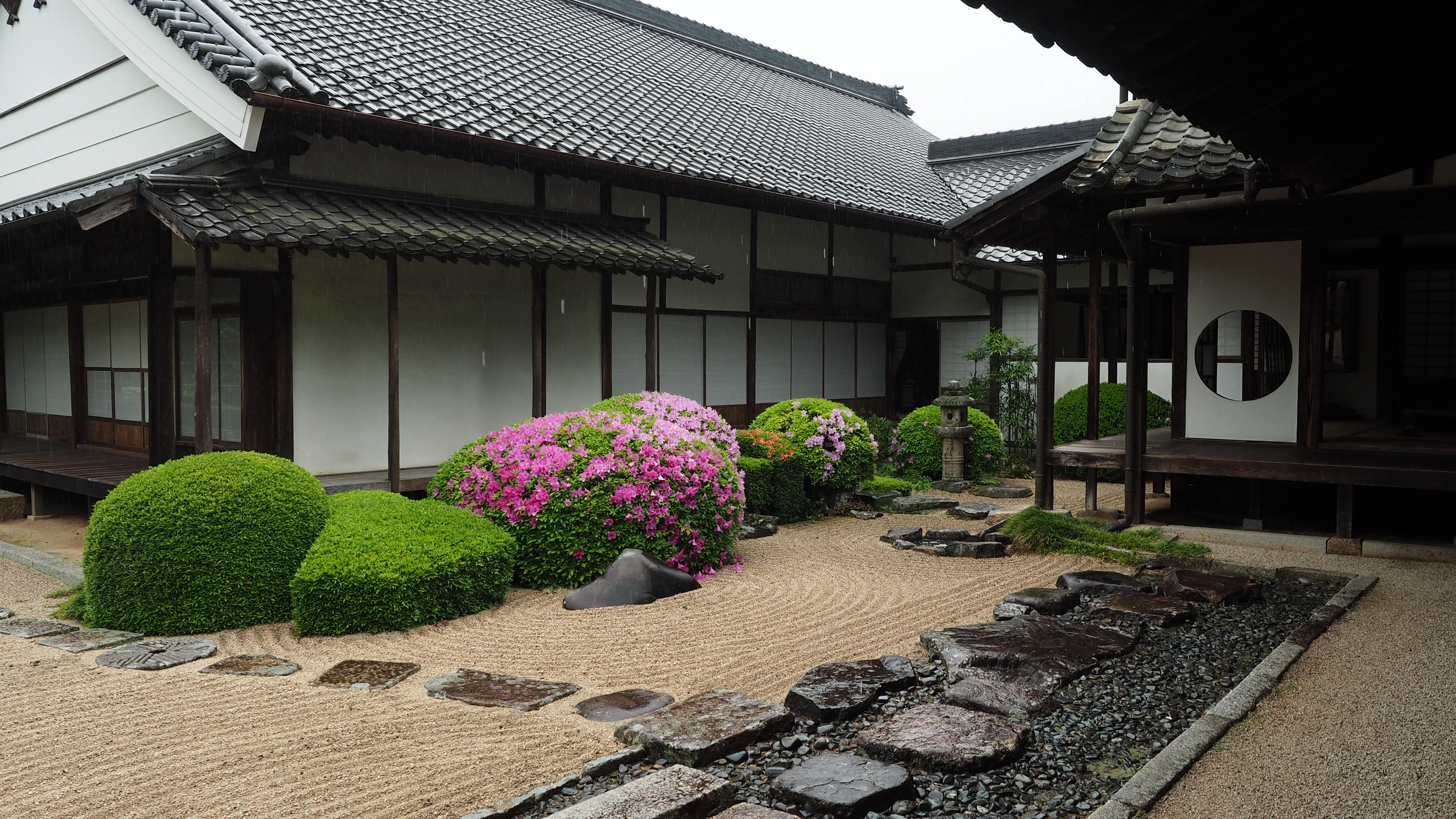
View from the Shoin

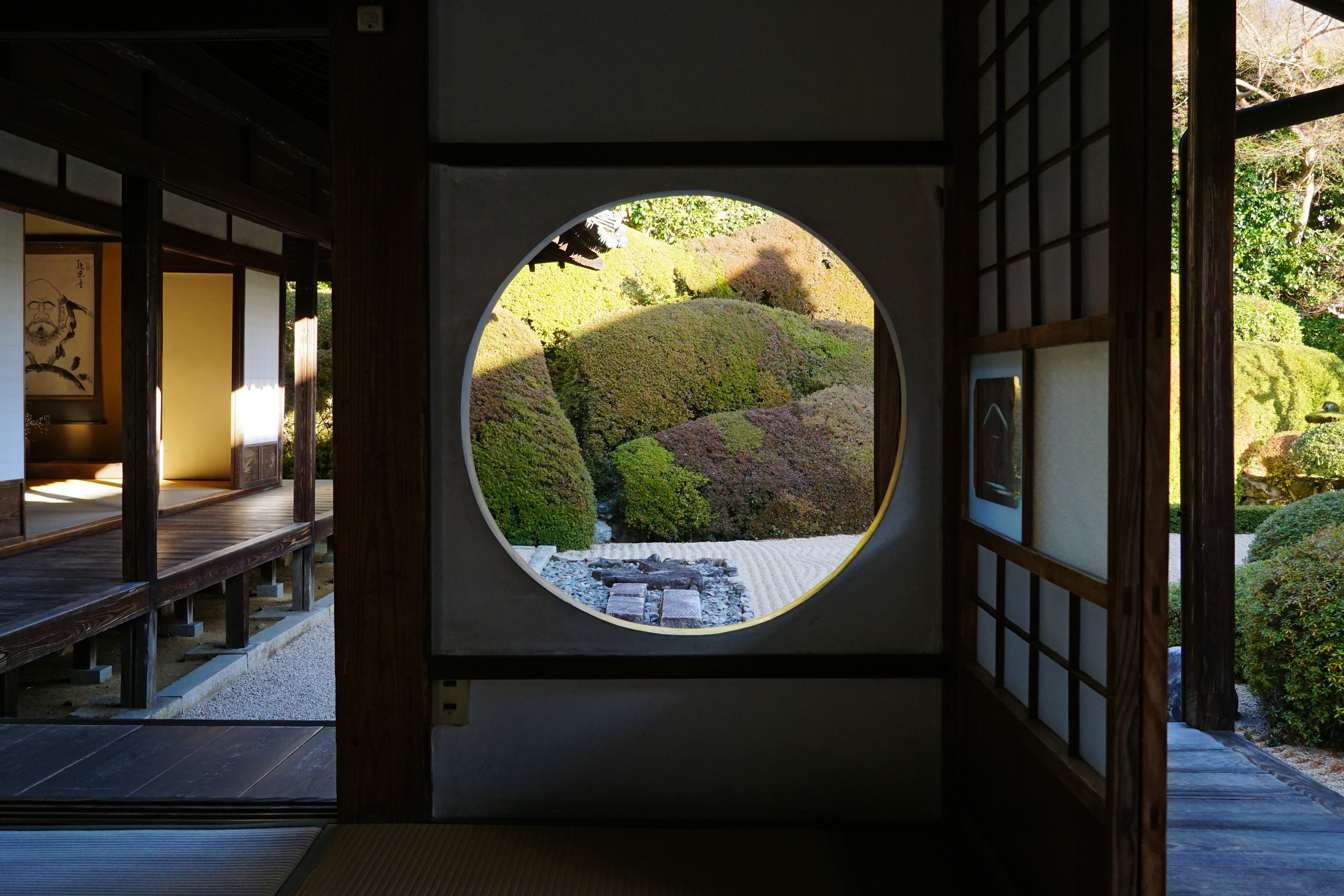
Shoin on the left

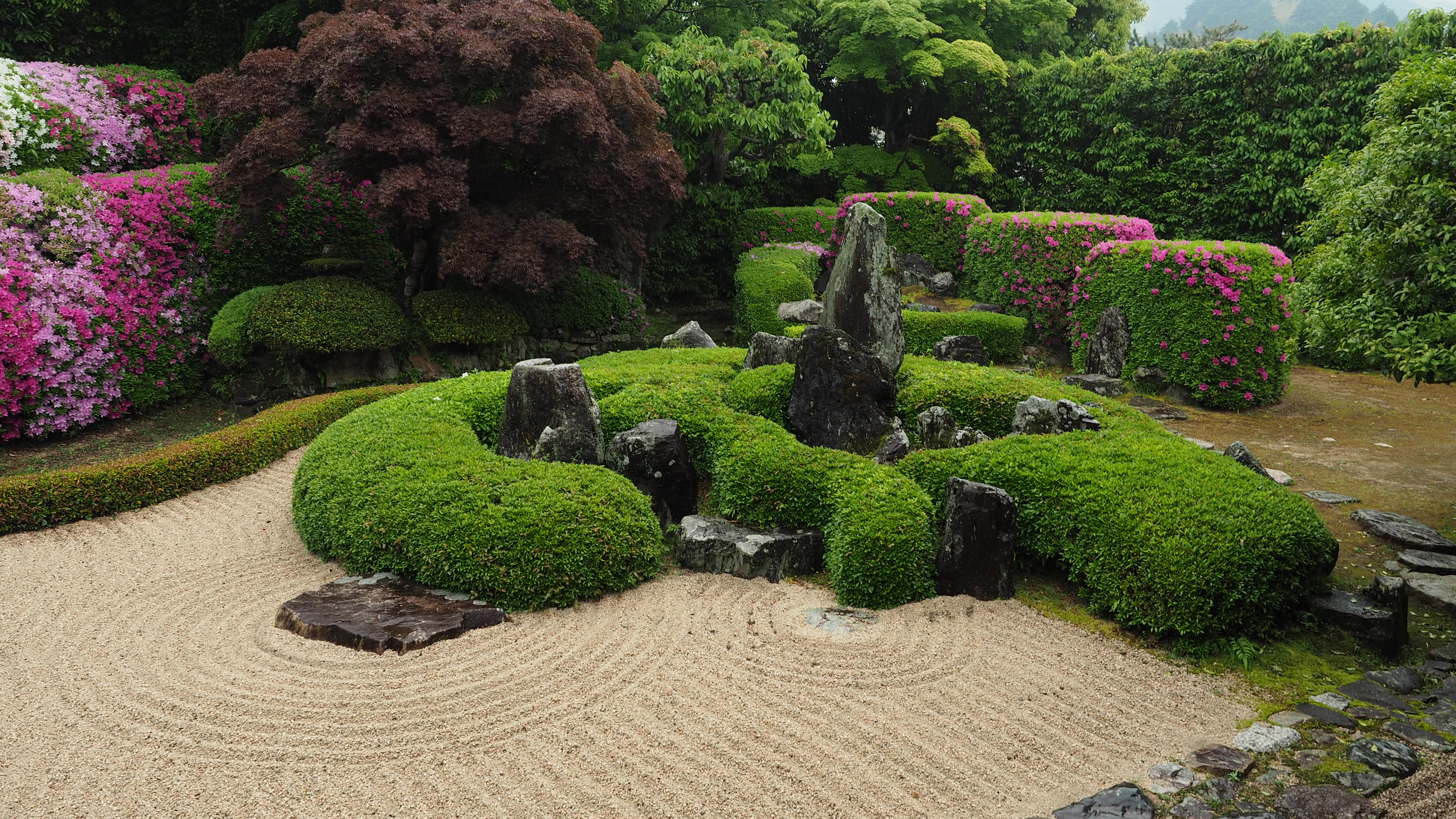
Crane and Turtle stones

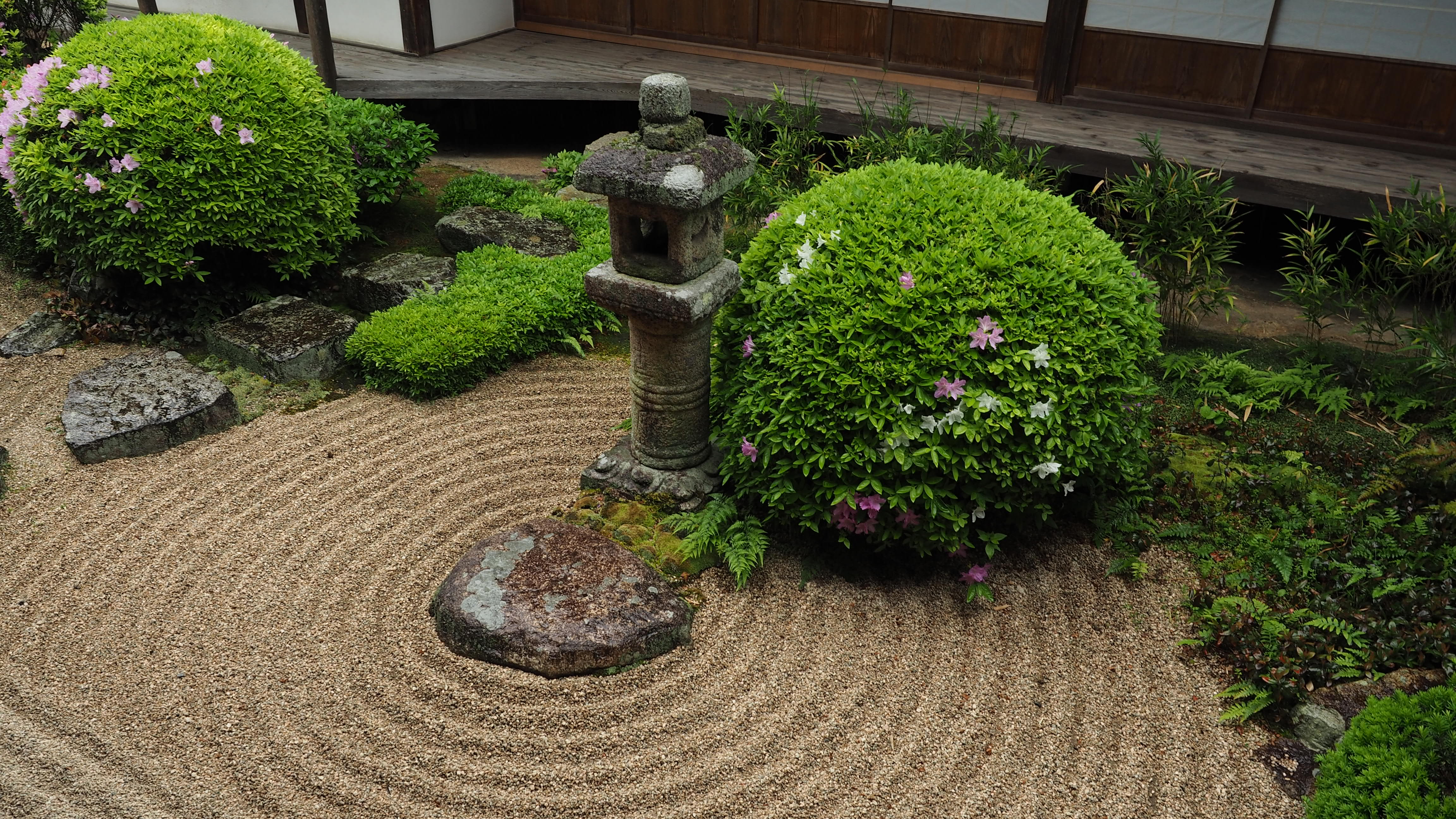
Stone lantern

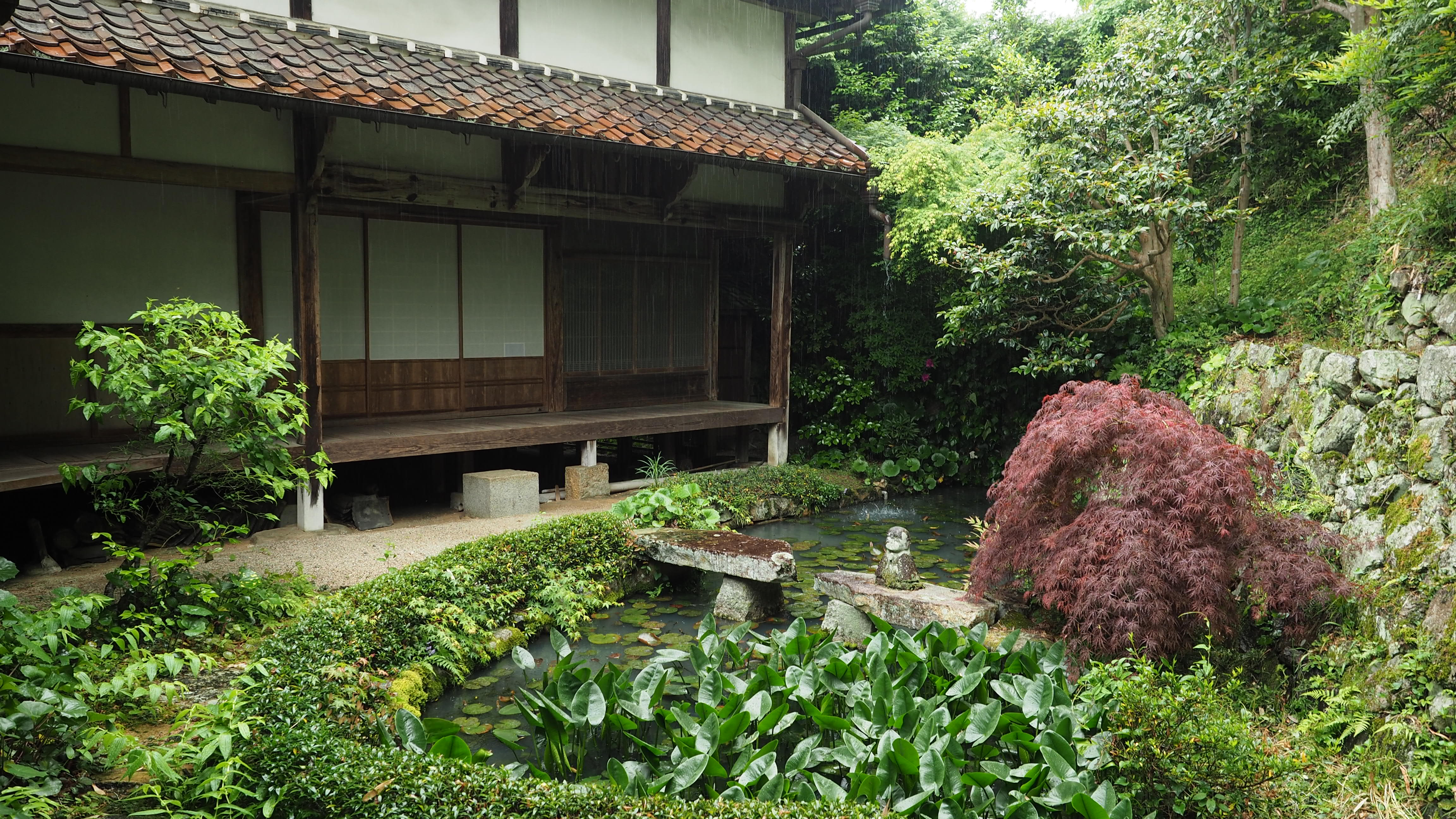
Pond on north side of Shōin. Main Hall on the left

== See also ==
- List of Places of Scenic Beauty of Japan (Okayama)
