= Kojima District, Okayama =

Former district in Okayama prefecture, Japan

Kojima (児島郡, Kojima-gun) is a district located in Okayama Prefecture, Japan.

As of 2003, the district had an estimated population of 15,872 and a density of 514.32 persons per km^{2}. The total area was 30.86 km^{2}. On March 22, 2005 - the town of Nadasaki, along with the town of Mitsu (from Mitsu District), was merged into the expanded city of Okayama.

== See also ==
- Nadasaki, Okayama
