= Kayō, Okayama =

Dissolved municipality in Okayama prefecture, Japan

Kayō (賀陽町, Kayō-chō) was a town located in Jōbō District, Okayama Prefecture, Japan.

As of 2003, the town had an estimated population of 8,188 and a density of 64.18 persons per km^{2}. The total area was 127.58 km^{2}.

On October 1, 2004, Kayō, along with the town of Kamogawa (from Mitsu District), was merged to create the town of Kibichūō (in the newly created Kaga District).
