= Mount Washu =

Mountain in Japan

Coordinates: 34.43501934°N 133.8111673°E

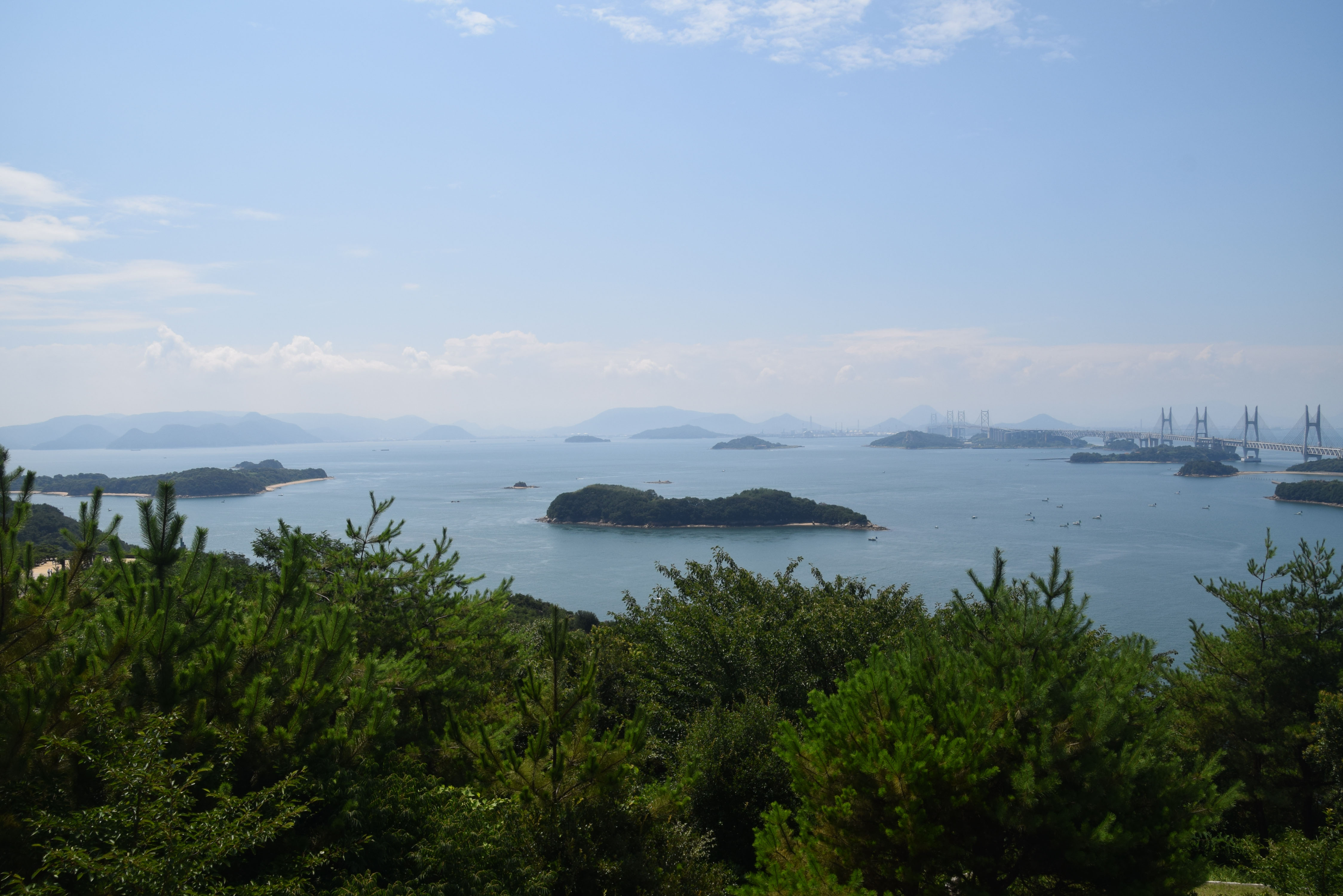
A traditional view at Mount Washu, Okayama, Japan, looking toward Shikoku Island across the Seto Inland Sea, full of small islands (the Great Seto Bridge on the extreme right)

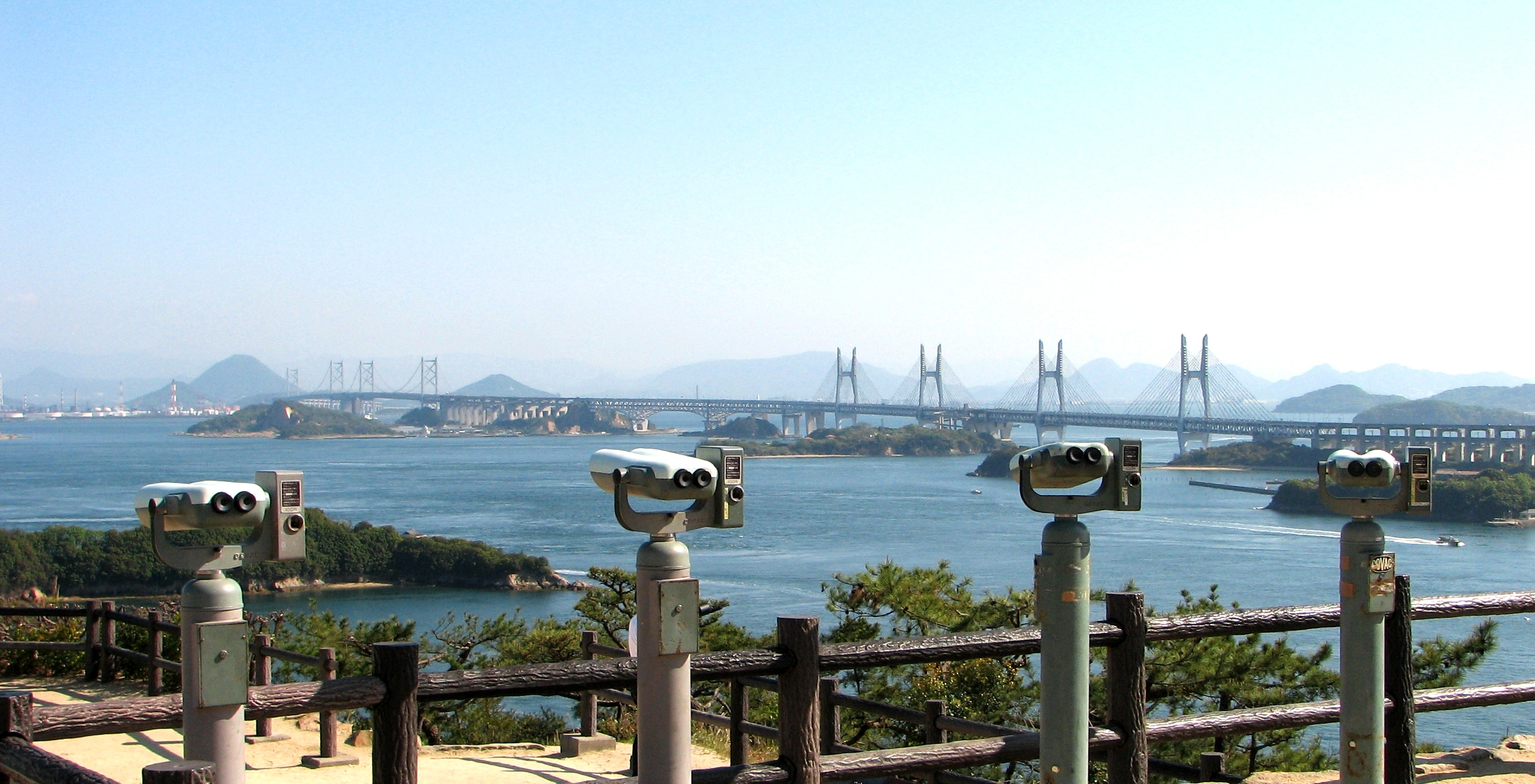
A modern view at Mount Washu, looking toward the Great Seto Bridge

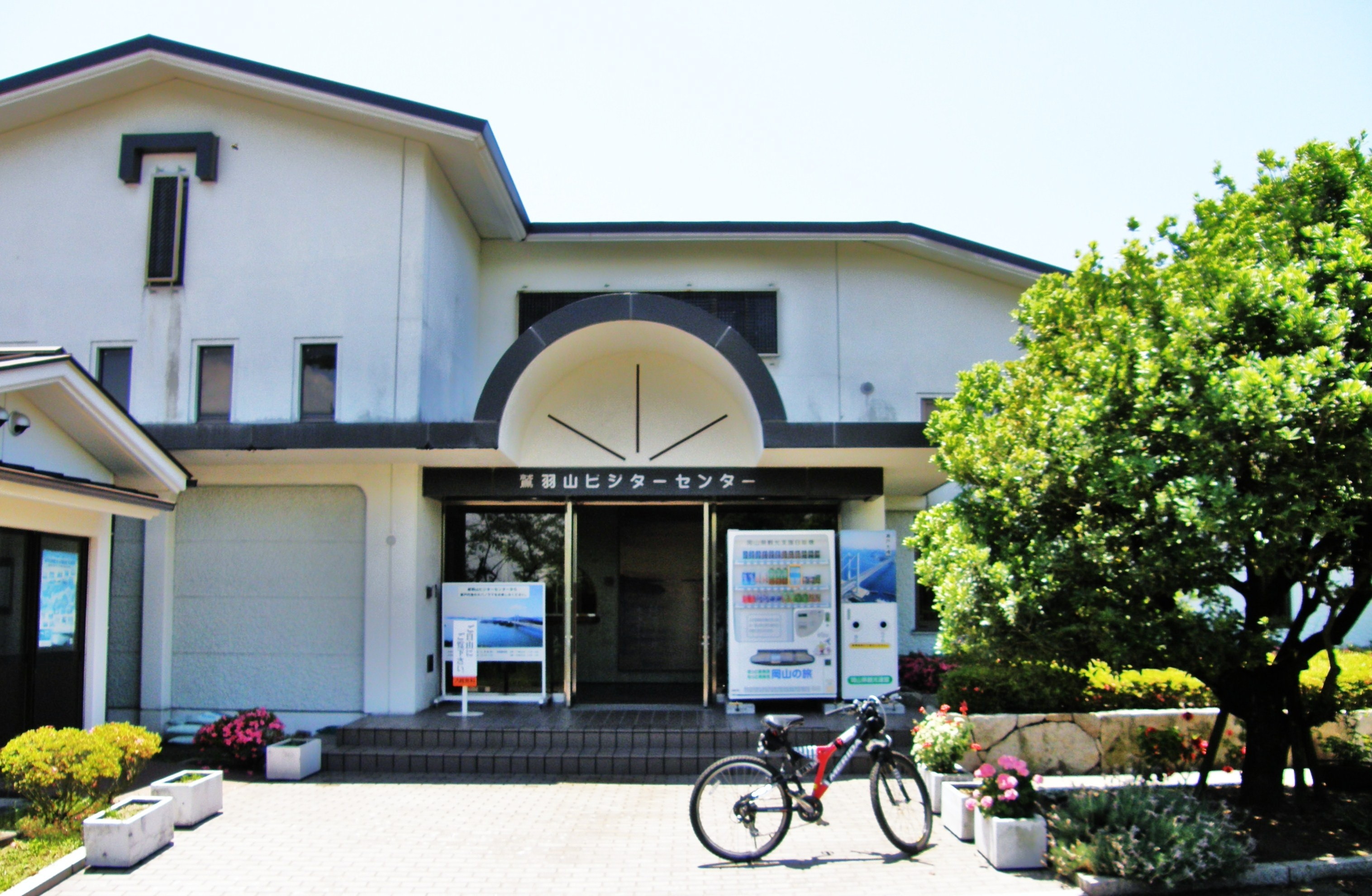
Washu-zan Visitor Center

Mount Washu or Washū-zan (Japanese: 鷲羽山) is a 133 meter hill in Shimotsui (下津井), Kurashiki, Japan, but famous traditionally for viewing the Seto Inland Sea dotted with various small islands, and now for commanding the majestic view of the Great Seto Bridge, one of the three bridges connecting Shikoku Island with the main Honshu Island.

On the hill are the visitor center and two observation points. Near the parking lot, now free, stands the stele of a local haiku poet's kyoka, "Shima hitotsu miyage ni hoshii Washū-zan" (Japanese: 島一つ土産に欲しい鷲羽山), which means: Mount Washu is the only precious souvenir that I want to bring back home from this trip.

== Transportation ==
Mount Washu can be reached in fifteen minutes by car from Kojima Station of JR's Honshi-Bisan Line or in ten minutes from Kojima Interchange (ja:児島インターチェンジ) of Seto-Chūō Expressway.

== See also ==
- Seto Inland Sea
- Kurashiki
