= Kibichūō =

Kibichūō 吉備中央町
- Town
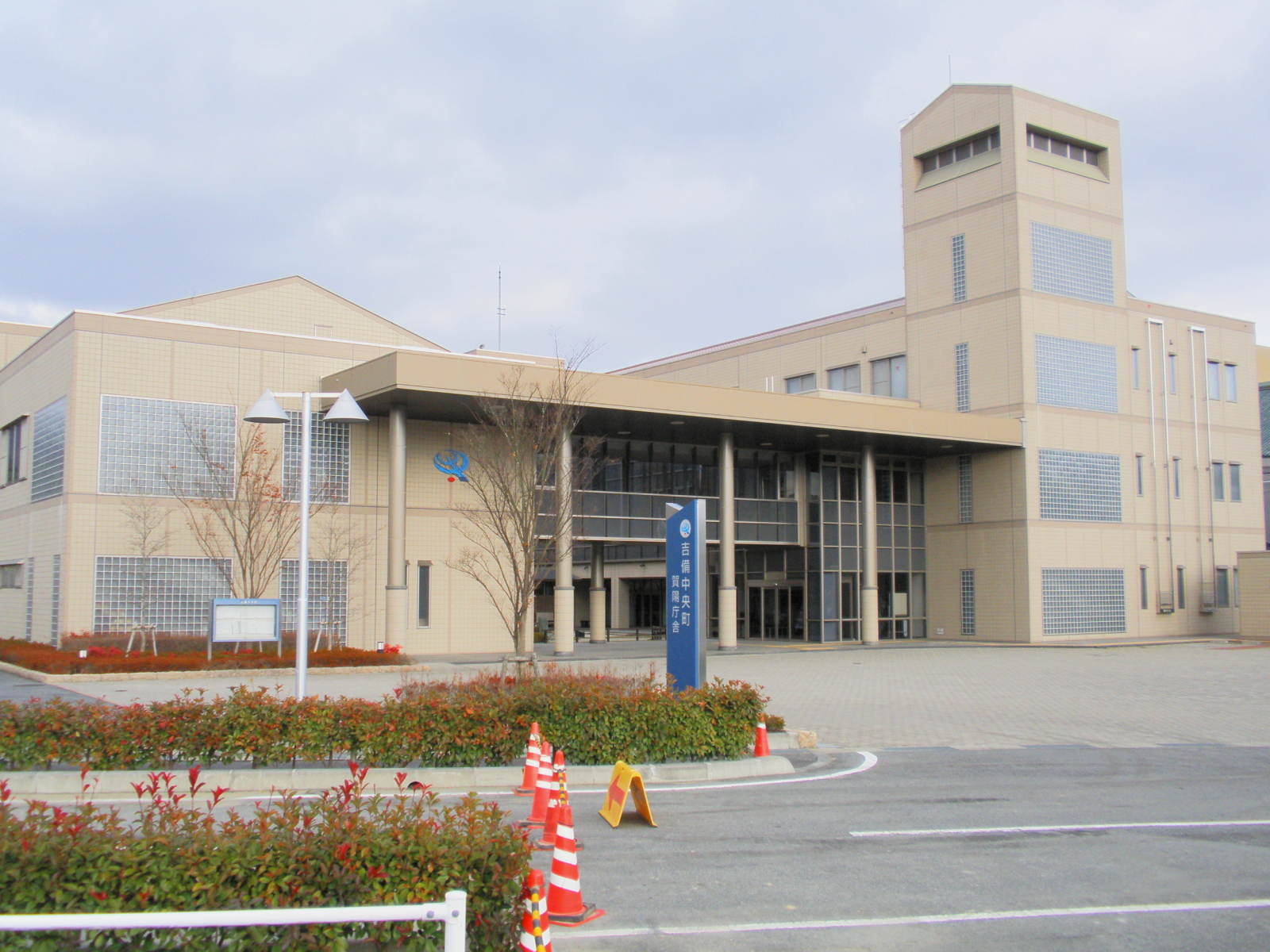
- Kibichūō town office

- Flag Chapter
- Interactive map of Kibichūō
- Location in Japan
- Coordinates: 34°51′48″N 133°41′37″E
- Country: Japan
- Region: Chūgoku; San'yō
- Prefecture: Okayama
- District: Kaga

Area
  - Total: 268.73 km^{2} (103.76 sq mi)

Population (March 1, 2023)
  - Total: 10,435
  - Density: 38.831/km^{2} (100.57/sq mi)
- Time zone: UTC+09:00 (JST)
- City hall address: 1-2 Toyono, Kibichuo-cho, Kaga-gun, Okayama-ken 716-1192
- Website: Official website
- Symbols
- Bird: Oriental dollarbird
- Flower: Azalea
- Tree: Japanese red pine

Kibichūō (吉備中央町, Kibichūō-chō) is a town located in Kaga District, Okayama Prefecture, Japan. As of 1 March 2023, the town had an estimated population of 10,435 in 5142 households and a population density of 39 persons per km^{2}. The total area of the town is 268.73 square kilometres (103.76 sq mi).

== Geography ==
Kibichūō is located in central Okayama Prefecture. Because it is a highland area with relatively gentle topography, the population distribution is dispersed throughout the town.

=== Neighbouring municipalities ===
Okayama Prefecture

- Kita-ku, Okayama
- Maniwa
- Misaki
- Sōja
- Takahashi

=== Climate ===
Kibichūō has a humid subtropical climate (Köppen climate classification Cfa) with very warm summers and cool winters. The average annual temperature in Kibichūō is 13.1 °C. The average annual rainfall is 1392 mm with September as the wettest month. The temperatures are highest on average in July, at around 25.0 °C, and lowest in January, at around1.6 °C.

== Demographics ==
Per Japanese census data, the population of Kibichūō has been declining steadily for the past 70 years.

Historical population
Year	Pop.	±%
1950	27,453	—
1960	24,829	−9.6%
1970	17,814	−28.3%
1980	15,366	−13.7%
1990	15,111	−1.7%
2000	14,653	−3.0%
2010	13,039	−11.0%

== History ==
The Kibichūō area is part of ancient Bitchū Province and as the town name implies, is roughly in the geographic center of the ancient Kingdom of Kibi. Following the Meiji restoration, the area was organized into villages within Jōbō District and Mitsu District, Okayama with the creation of the modern municipalities system on April 1, 1889.

Kibichūō was founded on October 1, 2004, by the merger of the town of Kamogawa, from Mitsu District, and the town of Kayō, from Jōbō District.

Beginning around the start of the Reiwa Era, Kibichuo started promoting itself publicly as a potential future capital of Japan. The reasoning being that it is extremely geologically stable, insulating it from the effects of a future earthquake disaster that could halt the function of government.

== Government ==
Kibichūō has a mayor-council form of government with a directly elected mayor and a unicameral town council of twelve members. Kibichūō, collectively with Kita-ku, Okayama, contributes eight member to the Okayama Prefectural Assembly. In terms of national politics, the town is part of the Okayama 1st district of the lower house of the Diet of Japan.

== Economy ==
The main economic activity of Kibichūō is agriculture and food processing. Pharmaceuticals are also important. Due to its proximity to Okayama, the town is increasingly becoming a commuter town.

== Education ==
Kibichūō has nine public elementary schools and one public junior high school operated by the town government and one private elementary school and one private junior high school. The town has one public high school operated by the Okayama Prefectural Board of Education.

== Transportation ==
=== Railway ===
Kibichūō does not have any passenger railway service. The nearest train stations are the JR West Hakubi Line Bitchu-Takahashi Station (from the west side of town), and the Tsuyama Line Kanagawa Station and Fukuwatari Station (from the east side of town).

=== Highways ===
- Okayama Expressway
- National Route 429
- National Route 484

== Sister cities ==
- Huai'an District, Jiangsu, China, friendship city since 1993.
