= Kume, Okayama =

Kume 久米町
- Former municipality
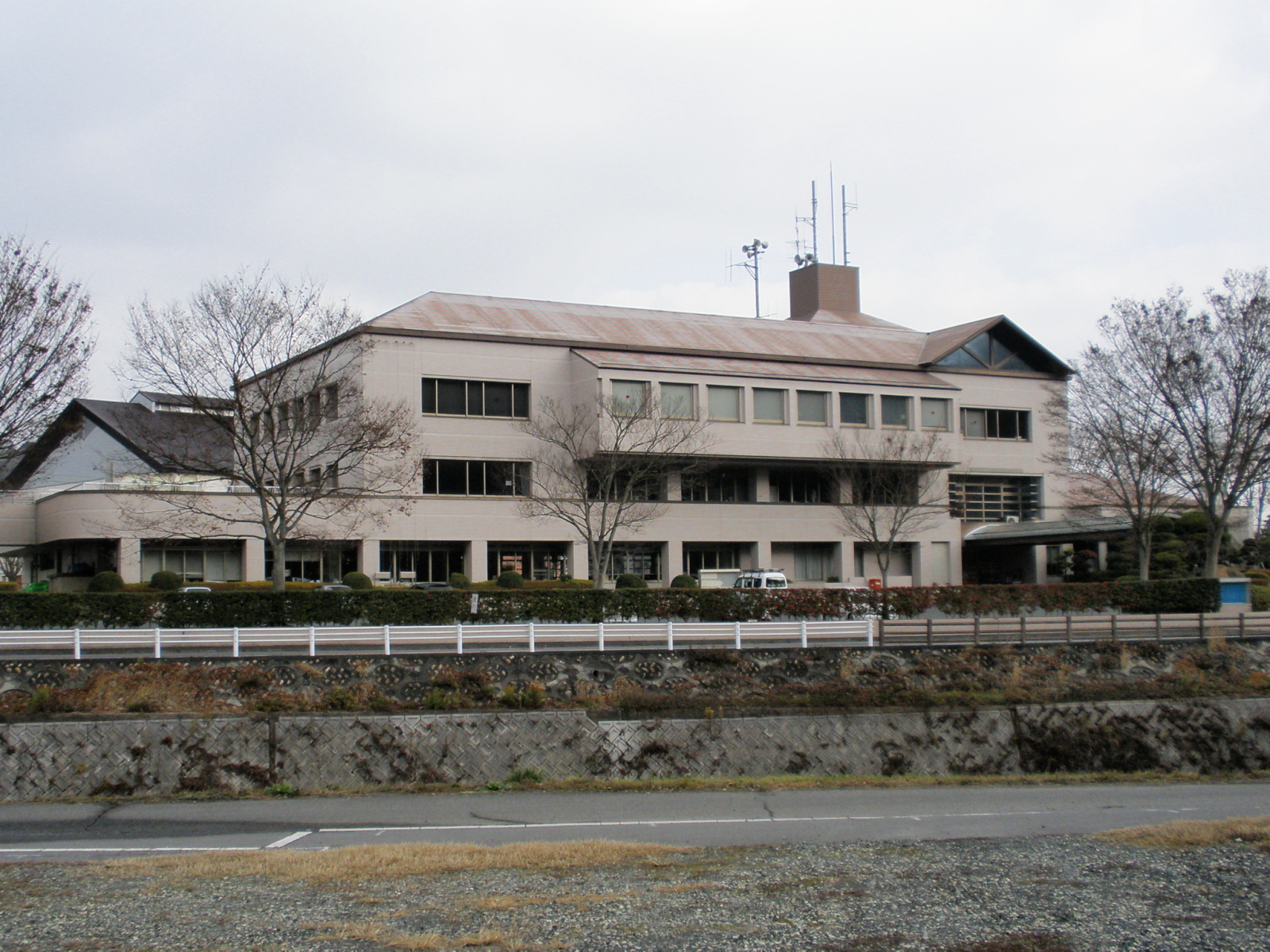
- Former Kume town hall

- Location in Japan
- Coordinates: 35°3′34″N 133°54′1″E
- Country: Japan
- Region: Chūgoku
- Prefecture: Okayama Prefecture
- District: Kume
- Merged: February 28, 2005 (now part of Tsuyama)

Area
  - Total: 74.39 km^{2} (28.72 sq mi)

Population (2003)
  - Total: 7,396
  - Density: 99.42/km^{2} (257.5/sq mi)
- Time zone: UTC+09:00 (JST)
- Symbols
- Flower: Chrysanthemum
- Tree: Prunus mume

Kume (久米町, Kume-chō) was a town located in Kume District, Okayama Prefecture, Japan.

As of 2003, the town had an estimated population of 7,396 and a density of 99.42 persons per km^{2}. The total area was 74.39 km^{2}.

On February 28, 2005, Kume, along with the town of Kamo, the village of Aba (both from Tomata District), and the town of Shōboku (from Katsuta District), was merged into the expanded city of Tsuyama and no longer exists as an independent municipality.

== Geography ==
- Rivers: Yoshii River

=== Adjoining municipalities ===
- Okayama Prefecture
  - Tsuyama
  - Chūō
  - Asahi
  - Ochiai
  - Kuse
  - Kagamino

== Education ==
- Kyōsyō Elementary School
- Chūsei Elementary School
- Seidō Elementary School
- Shūjitsu Elementary School
- Kume Junior High School

== Transportation ==
=== Railways ===
- West Japan Railway Company
  - Kishin Line
    - Tsuboi Station - Mimasaka-Sendai Station

=== Road ===
- Expressways:
  - Chūgoku Expressway
    - Kume Bus Stop
    - Innoshō Interchange (Tsuyama)
- National highways:
  - Route 181
  - Route 429
- Prefectural roads:
  - Okayama Prefectural Route 70 (Kume-Takebe)
  - Okayama Prefectural Route 159 (Kume-Chūō)
  - Okayama Prefectural Route 205 (Mimasaka-Sendai Station)
  - Okayama Prefectural Route 335 (Yonokami-Kume)
  - Okayama Prefectural Route 337 (Yamashiro-Miyao)
  - Okayama Prefectural Route 339 (Nishiichinomiya-Nakagitakami)
  - Okayama Prefectural Route 340 (Kōmoto-Kume)
  - Okayama Prefectural Route 341 (Tsuboi-Shimotochibara)
  - Okayama Prefectural Route 455 (Koyama-Kuwakami)
- Roadside Station
  - Kume no Sato
