= Kamo, Okayama =

Kamo 加茂町
- Former municipality
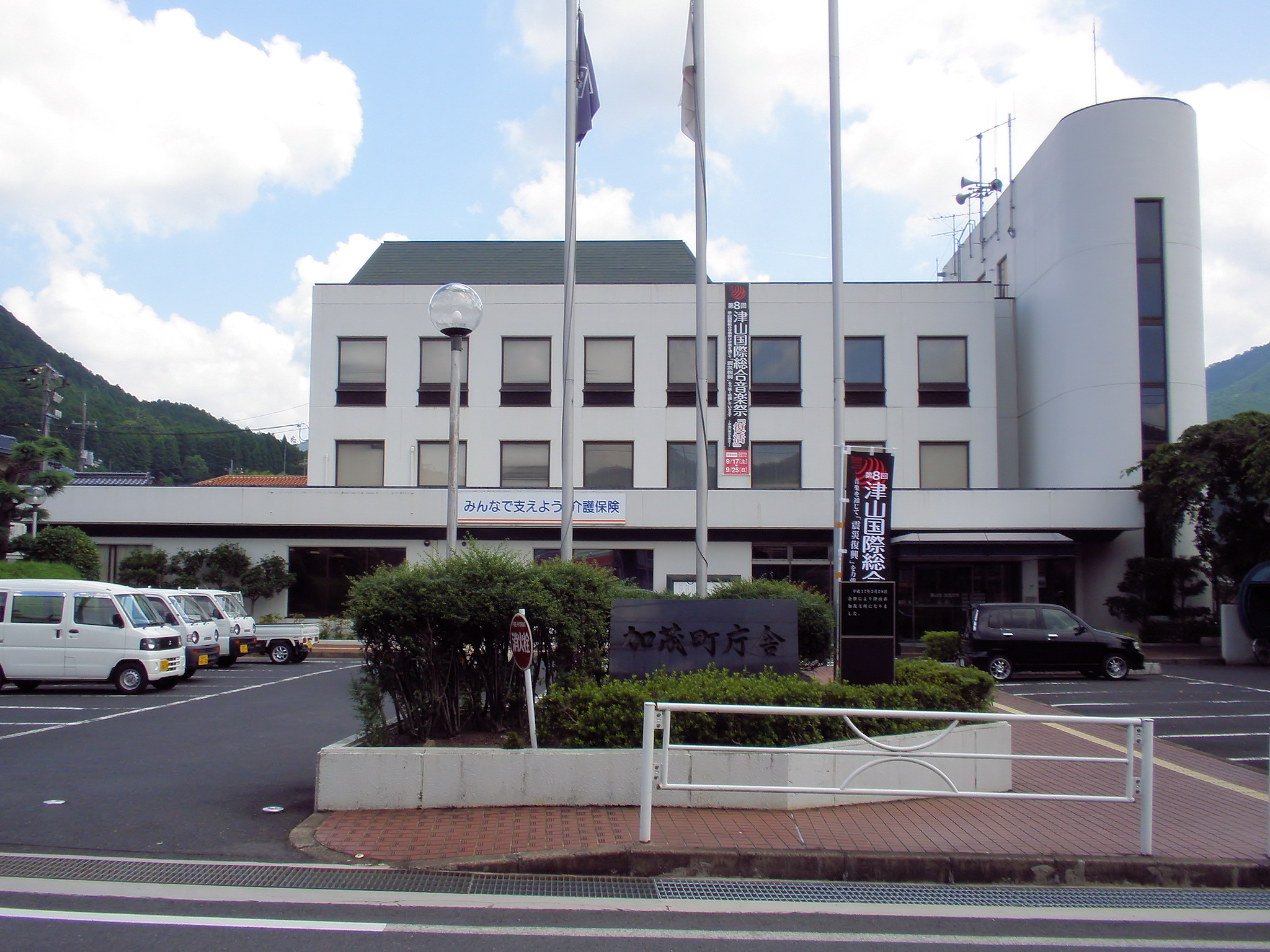
- Former Kamo town hall

- Location in Japan
- Coordinates: 35°10′41.4″N 134°3′14.5″E
- Country: Japan
- Region: Chūgoku
- Prefecture: Okayama Prefecture
- District: Tomata
- Merged: February 28, 2005 (now part of Tsuyama)

Area
  - Total: 159.27 km^{2} (61.49 sq mi)

Population (2003)
  - Total: 5,311
  - Density: 33.35/km^{2} (86.4/sq mi)
- Time zone: UTC+09:00 (JST)
- Symbols
- Bird: Japanese bush-warbler
- Flower: Satsuki azalea
- Tree: Chamaecyparis obtusa

Kamo (加茂町, Kamo-chō) was a town located in Tomata District, Okayama Prefecture, Japan.

As of 2003, the town had an estimated population of 5,311 and a density of 33.35 persons per km^{2}. The total area was 159.27 km^{2}.

On February 28, 2005, Kamo, along with the village of Aba (also from Tomata District), the town of Shōboku (from Katsuta District), and the town of Kume (from Kume District), was merged into the expanded city of Tsuyama and no longer exists as an independent municipality.

== Massacre ==
On 21 May 1938, the town became the scene of the deadliest shooting by a lone gunman in Japanese history. A 21-year-old man murdered 30 people (including his own grandmother) and wounded three others before killing himself.

== Geography ==
=== Adjoining municipalities ===
- Okayama Prefecture
  - Tsuyama
  - Kagamino
  - Kamisaibara
  - Aba
  - Shōboku
- Tottori Prefecture
  - Tottori
  - Chizu

== Education ==
- Kamo Elementary School
- Kamo Junior High School

== Transportation ==
=== Railways ===
- West Japan Railway Company
  - Inbi Line
    - Mimasaka-Kamo Station - Chiwa Station - Mimasaka-Kawai Station

=== Road ===
- Prefectural roads:
  - Okayama Prefectural Route 6 (Tsuyama-Chizu-Hattō)
  - Okayama Prefectural Route 68 (Tsuyama-Kamo)
  - Okayama Prefectural Route 75 (Kamo-Okutsu)
  - Okayama Prefectural Route 118 (Kamo-Mochigase)
  - Okayama Prefectural Route 336 (Kurami-Sainotani)
