= List of mass shootings by death toll =

A mass shooting is a violent crime in which one or more attackers use a firearm to kill or injure multiple individuals in rapid succession. There is no widely accepted specific definition, and different organizations tracking such incidents use different criteria. Mass shootings are generally characterized by the targeting (often indiscriminate) of victims in a non-combat setting, and thus the term generally excludes bombings, gang violence, shootouts, and warfare. Mass shootings may be done for personal or psychological reasons, such as by individuals who are deeply disgruntled, seeking notoriety, or are intensely angry at a perceived grievance; though they have also been used as a terrorist tactic, such as when members of an ethnic or religious minority are targeted. The perpetrator of an ongoing mass shooting may be referred to as an active shooter. Most of them took place in public places.

== List ==
List Of Biggest Mass Shootings In The World
Year	Incident	Location	Deaths	Ref
1944	Sant'Anna di Stazzema massacre	Sant'Anna di Stazzema, Italy	560	
2023	Nova music festival massacre	Eshkol Regional Council, Israel	378	
2004	Beslan school siege	Beslan, North Ossetia–Alania, Russia	334+	
2008	2008 Mumbai attacks	Mumbai, India	175	
2024	Crocus City Hall attack	Krasnogorsk, Moscow Oblast, Russia	151	
2014	2014 Peshawar school massacre	Peshawar, Pakistan	149	
2015	Garissa University College attack	Garissa, Kenya	148	
2021	Tillia massacres	Tillia, Tahoua Region, Niger	141	
2015	November 2015 Paris attacks	Paris and Saint-Denis, France	129 (gunfire) + 1 (bomb)	
2011	2011 Norway attacks	Oslo and Utøya, Norway	67 (gunfire) + 8 (bomb) + 2 (indirectly)	
2013	Westgate shopping mall attack	Westlands, Nairobi, Kenya	66 (gunfire) + 1 (friendly fire)	
2017	2017 Las Vegas shooting	Las Vegas, Nevada, United States	60	
1997	Luxor massacre	Luxor, Egypt	~60	
1982	Woo Bum-kon incident	Uiryeong County, South Gyeongsang Province, South Korea	56	
2019	Christchurch mosque shootings	Christchurch, New Zealand	51	
2016	Pulse nightclub shooting	Orlando, Florida, United States	49	
2019	2019 Fada N'Gourma attack	Fada N'Gourma, Burkina Faso	39+	
2017	Istanbul nightclub shooting	Istanbul, Turkey	39	
2015	2015 Sousse attacks	Riu Imperial Marhaba and Soviva, Port El Kantaoui, Sousse, Tunisia	38	
2022	2022 Nong Bua Lamphu massacre	Na Klang district, Nong Bua Lamphu pronvince, Thailand	37	
1996	Port Arthur massacre	Port Arthur, Tasmania, Australia	35	
1999	Mikenskaya shooting	Mikenskaya, Ichkeria, Russia	34	
1995	Zhaodong massacre	Zhaodong, Heilongjiang province, China	32	
2007	Virginia Tech shooting	Blacksburg, Virginia, United States	32	
2020	6 March 2020 Kabul shooting	Kabul, Afghanistan	32+	
1938	Tsuyama massacre	Kamo, Okayama Prefecture, Japan	30	

== See also ==
- List of mass shootings in the United States by death toll
- List of school massacres by death toll
