= Shōboku, Okayama =

Shōboku 勝北町
- Former municipality
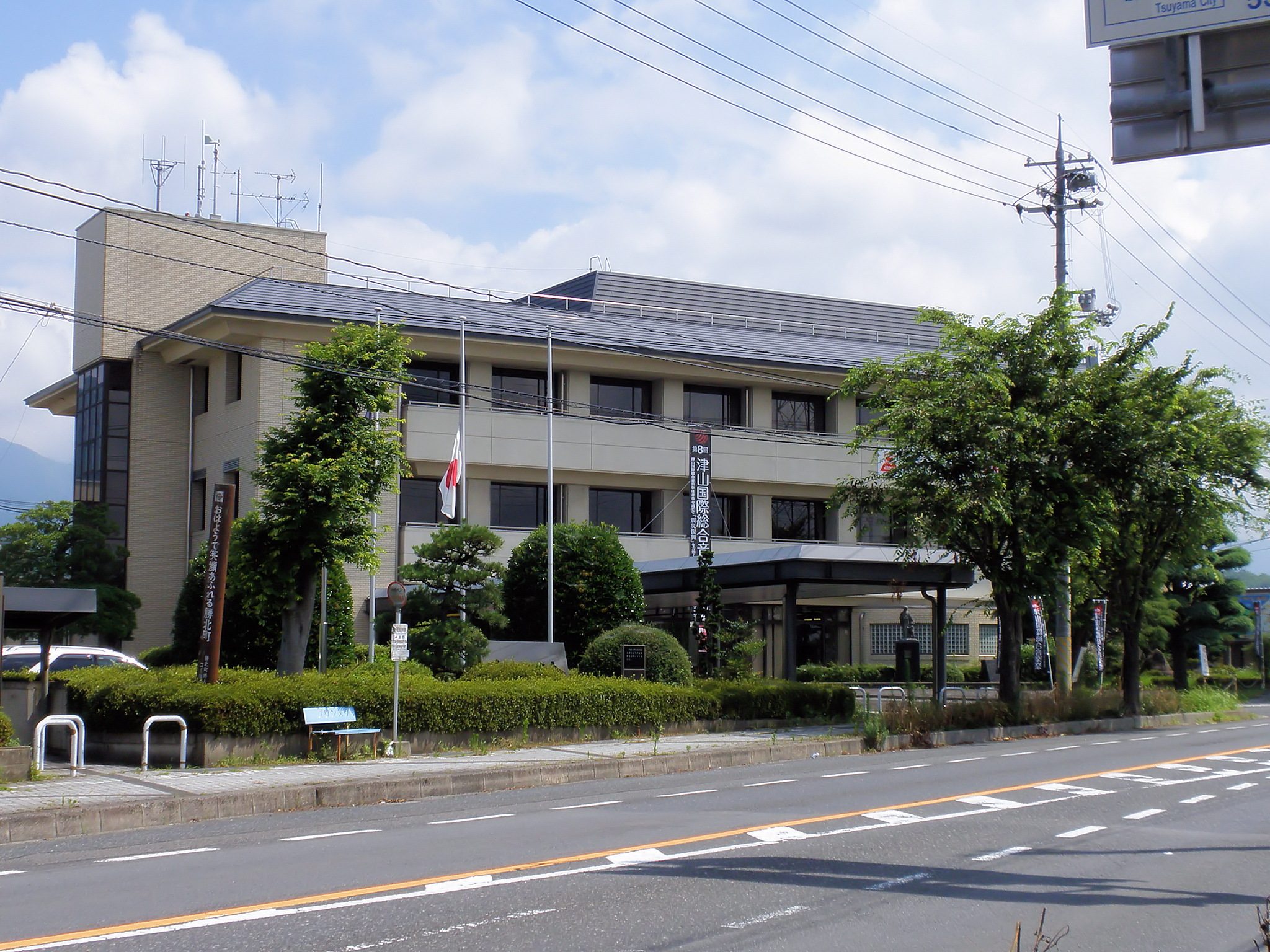
- Former Shōboku town hall

- Location in Japan
- Coordinates: 35°6′17.35″N 134°6′46.25″E
- Country: Japan
- Region: Chūgoku
- Prefecture: Okayama Prefecture
- District: Katsuta
- Merged: February 28, 2005 (now part of Tsuyama)

Area
  - Total: 44.90 km^{2} (17.34 sq mi)

Population (2003)
  - Total: 7,494
  - Density: 166.9/km^{2} (432/sq mi)
- Time zone: UTC+09:00 (JST)
- Symbols
- Bird: Japanese bush-warbler
- Flower: Satsuki azalea
- Tree: Zelkova serrata

Shōboku (勝北町, Shōboku-chō) was a town located in Katsuta District, Okayama Prefecture, Japan.

== Population ==
As of 2003, the town had an estimated population of 7,494 and a density of 166.90 persons per km^{2}. The total area was 44.90 km^{2}.

== History ==
On February 28, 2005, Shōboku, along with the town of Kamo, the village of Aba (both from Tomata District), and the town of Kume (from Kume District), was merged into the expanded city of Tsuyama and no longer exists as an independent municipality.

== Geography ==
=== Adjoining municipalities ===
- Okayama Prefecture
  - Tsuyama
  - Kamo
  - Shōō
  - Nagi
- Tottori Prefecture
  - Chizu

== Education ==
- Niino Elementary School
- Hirodo Elementary School
- Shōkamo Elementary School
- Shōboku Junior High School

== Transportation ==
=== Road ===
- National highways:
  - Route 53
  - Route 429
- Prefectural roads:
  - Okayama Prefectural Route 67 (Shōō-Shōboku)
  - Okayama Prefectural Route 348 (Horisaka-Shōboku)
  - Okayama Prefectural Route 415 (Kumon-Shōō)
  - Okayama Prefectural Route 450 (Miura-Shōboku)
