= Tomi, Okayama =

Dissolved municipality in Okayama prefecture, Japan

Tomi (富村, Tomi-son) was a village located in Tomata District, Okayama Prefecture, Japan.

As of 2003 (before the merger), the village had an estimated population of 817 and a density of 10.73 persons per km^{2}. The total area was 76.13 km^{2}.

On March 1, 2005, Tomi, along with the town of Okutsu, and the village of Kamisaibara (all from Tomata District), was merged into the expanded town of Kagamino.
