= Aba, Okayama =

Aba 阿波村
- Former municipality
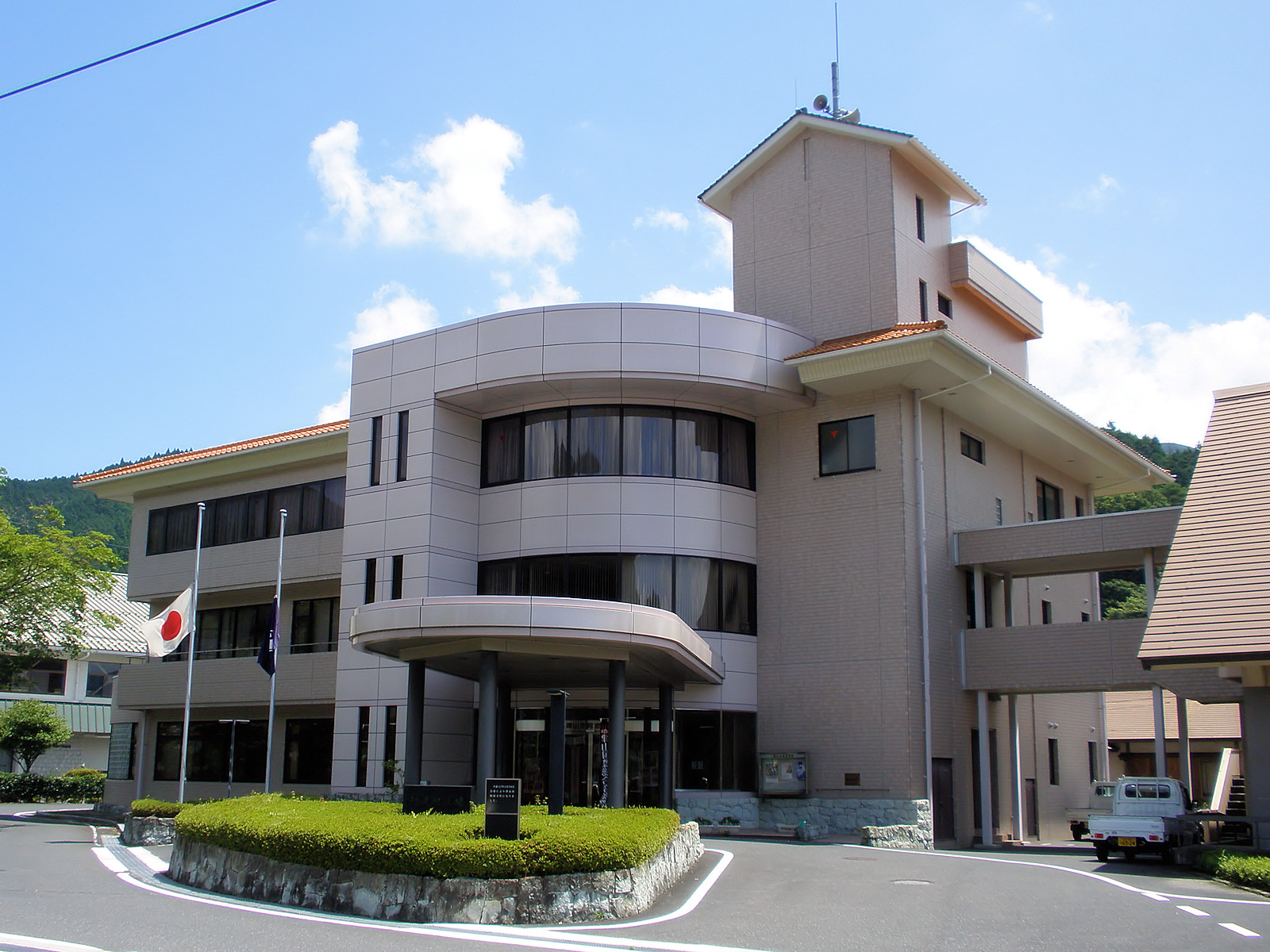
- Former Aba village hall

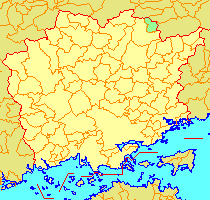
- Location of Aba in Okayama Prefecture

- Location in Japan
- Coordinates: 35°14′13.45″N 134°6′45.2″E
- Country: Japan
- Region: Chūgoku
- Prefecture: Okayama Prefecture
- District: Tomata
- Merged: February 28, 2005 (now part of Tsuyama)

Area
  - Total: 42.07 km^{2} (16.24 sq mi)

Population (2003)
  - Total: 669
  - Density: 15.9/km^{2} (41/sq mi)
- Time zone: UTC+09:00 (JST)
- Symbols
- Bird: Japanese bush-warbler
- Flower: Magnolia kobus
- Tree: Cryptomeria

Aba (阿波村, Aba-son) was a village in the north of Tomata District, Okayama Prefecture, Japan, sharing a border with Tottori Prefecture.

As of 2003, the village had an estimated population of 669 and a population density of 15.90 persons per km^{2}. The total area was 42.07 km^{2}.

On February 28, 2005, Aba, along with the town of Kamo (also from Tomata District), the town of Shōboku (from Katsuta District), and the town of Kume (from Kume District), was merged into the expanded city of Tsuyama and no longer exists as an independent municipality.

Most of Aba's area is forest and/or mountains, and its major industries are agriculture and forestry. It has been affected by rural depopulation, leaving it with the smallest population in the prefecture.

== Geography ==
=== Adjoining municipalities ===
- Okayama Prefecture
  - Kamo
- Tottori Prefecture
  - Tottori
  - Chizu

== Transportation ==
=== Road ===
- Prefectural roads:
  - Okayama Prefectural Route 117 (Gomasugaeri-Yodo)
  - Okayama Prefectural Route 118 (Kamo-Mochigase)
