= Tsuyama massacre =

1938 spree killing in Japan

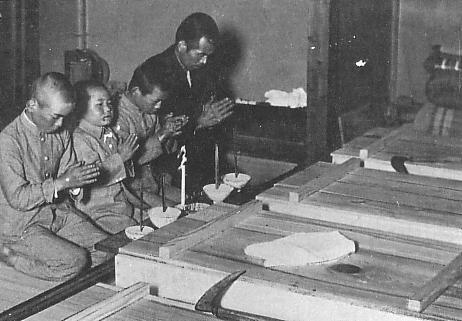
- The aftermath of the Tsuyama massacre
- Location: 35°9′32.60″N 134°02′3.32″E; Kamocho Yukishige, Kamo, Tsuyama, Okayama Prefecture, Empire of Japan
- Date: 21 May 1938; 1:30 a.m. – 3:00 a.m.
- Target: Villagers
- Attack type: Mass murder, mass shooting, mass stabbing, murder–suicide
- Weapons: Remington M11 shotgun; Katana; Axe; 2 daggers (Unused)
- Deaths: 31 (including the perpetrator)
- Injuries: 3
- Perpetrator: Mutsuo Toi
- Motive: Revenge for sexual and social rejection and resentment towards neighbors

The Tsuyama massacre (津山事件, Tsuyama jiken) was a mass murder-suicide that occurred on the night of 21 May 1938 in the rural village of Kamocho Yukishige close to Kamo, Tsuyama in Okayama, Empire of Japan. Mutsuo Toi (都井 睦雄, Toi Mutsuo), a 21-year-old man, killed 30 people — including his own grandmother — and seriously injured three others using a Remington shotgun, a katana, two daggers and an axe, before killing himself with the shotgun. It is the deadliest shooting by a lone gunman in Japanese history.

His suicide notes indicate revenge for social rejection and stigmatization due to tuberculosis as the motive for the murders; in May 1937, he was diagnosed with tuberculosis and the young women in the village with whom he previously had premarital affairs all started rejecting his sexual advances.

== Background ==
The massacre was carried out in the small village of Kamocho Yukishige near Kamo in Okayama, now part of the city of Tsuyama. The village's population at the time of the massacre was 111 people in 23 households.

=== Perpetrator ===
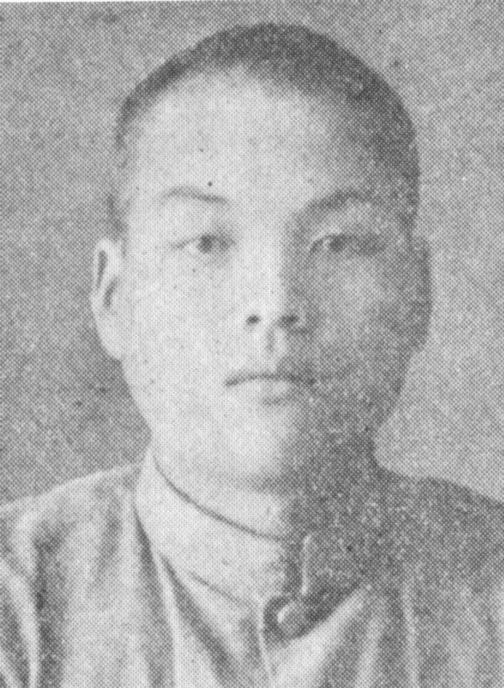
Mutsuo Toi, the 21-year-old responsible for the Tsuyama massacre, pictured before 1938

Mutsuo Toi (都井 睦雄, Toi Mutsuo; 5 March 1917 – 21 May 1938) was born in Kurami, Tomata District, Okayama Prefecture to a well-off rural family. His parents died of tuberculosis when he was a baby and he and his sister were brought up by their grandmother. Toi was a good student in primary school and was originally an outgoing boy, but did not go to middle school due to objection from his grandmother, who was quite strict with her grandchildren socializing with outsiders. After his sister got married and left the household in 1934, 17-year-old Toi became socially withdrawn.

In May 1937, shortly after graduating, Toi contracted pleurisy and was barred from agriculture work by his physicians. In that same year, Toi was conscripted due to the Second Sino-Japanese War, but was graded "C" (unfit) due to his tuberculosis. His previous lovers then started rejecting him.

Dejected, he lost interest in further education and became interested in the story of Sada Abe, a prostitute who infamously strangled her lover and then severed his genitals in May 1936. He had started writing a novel, Yūtokaiōmaru (雄図海王丸), which he used for storytelling to other children. He also took part in "Yobai" (夜這い) or "night-crawling", an illegal but persistent rural custom which involved young men creeping into young women's bedrooms during the night to seek sexual intercourse.

Toi acquired a hunting license and a double-barreled shotgun, which he sold the following year to obtain a five-shot 12-gauge Remington M11 shotgun, under the excuse of culling wild beasts. He would head into the mountains to practice shooting during the day, and wander around the village at night openly carrying his gun, often startling his neighbors. When he attempted to slip her prescribed medicine into his grandmother's miso soup -- she had been stubbornly refusing to take it -- she called the police accusing him of trying to poison her. Despite being cleared of the suspicion, the police took the opportunity to confiscate his gun and hunting knives, and revoking his license. However, Toi managed to acquire another second-hand Remington shotgun, more daggers and knives, and a katana from sword collectors illegally.

== Massacre ==
It is uncertain why Toi chose the night of 21 May, 1938 to commit the killings. He held a grudge against two of his ex-lovers, with whom he had sustained affairs out of their wedlock, and they had just returned to their hometown to visit family; it might be Toi decided impulsively to enact revenge due to opportunity.

Toi cut the power line to the village on the evening of 20 May, causing an outage that plunged it in darkness. At around 1:30 a.m. on 21 May, he killed his 76-year-old grandmother in her sleep by decapitating her with an axe. Armed with the axe, a katana, two daggers, a Remington M11 shotgun (which he had modified into an extended tube that could hold nine shells instead of five) and 200 rounds of ammunition, he strapped two flashlights to his head and prowled through the village, entering the homes like he had done previously during his "night-crawling" or "Yobai" (夜這い).

In a shooting spree that only took about an hour and a half, Toi killed 29 people (27 of whom died at the scene; 2 fatally wounded later succumbed to their injuries) and seriously injured three others. At dawn, he committed suicide by shooting himself in the chest on a nearby mountain.

== Suicide notes ==
Toi left several long suicide notes which revealed that he struggled with the social impact of his tuberculosis diagnosis, which in the 1930s, was an incurable illness. He felt that his female acquaintances (especially his former lovers) became cold towards him once his illness was outed, that he was despised as hypersexual, and felt insulted and ill-treated. In planning his murderous revenge, he waited for the moment when the most targets were available, but also expressed regret as to not being able to kill some people he had wanted to, as that would have involved killing people he regarded as innocent. He killed his grandmother because he could not bear leaving her alive to face the shame and social stigma that would be associated with being a "murderer's grandmother".

== Films ==
The 1983 Japanese film, Ushimitsu no mura (Village of Doom), was based on the massacre. It stars Masato Furuoya as Tsugio Inumaru, an emotionally distraught young man who goes on a violent killing spree after his tuberculosis keeps him from serving in World War II.

- Fukushûki, 1969 (Vengeance Demon) (復讐鬼)
- The 8-Tomb Village, 1951
- The 8-Tomb Village, 1977
- The 8-Tomb Village, 1996

== See also ==
- List of massacres in Japan
- List of rampage killers
