= Mimasaka-Ochiai Station =

Railway station in Mainwa, Okayama Prefecture, Japan

Mimasaka-Ochiai Station 美作落合駅
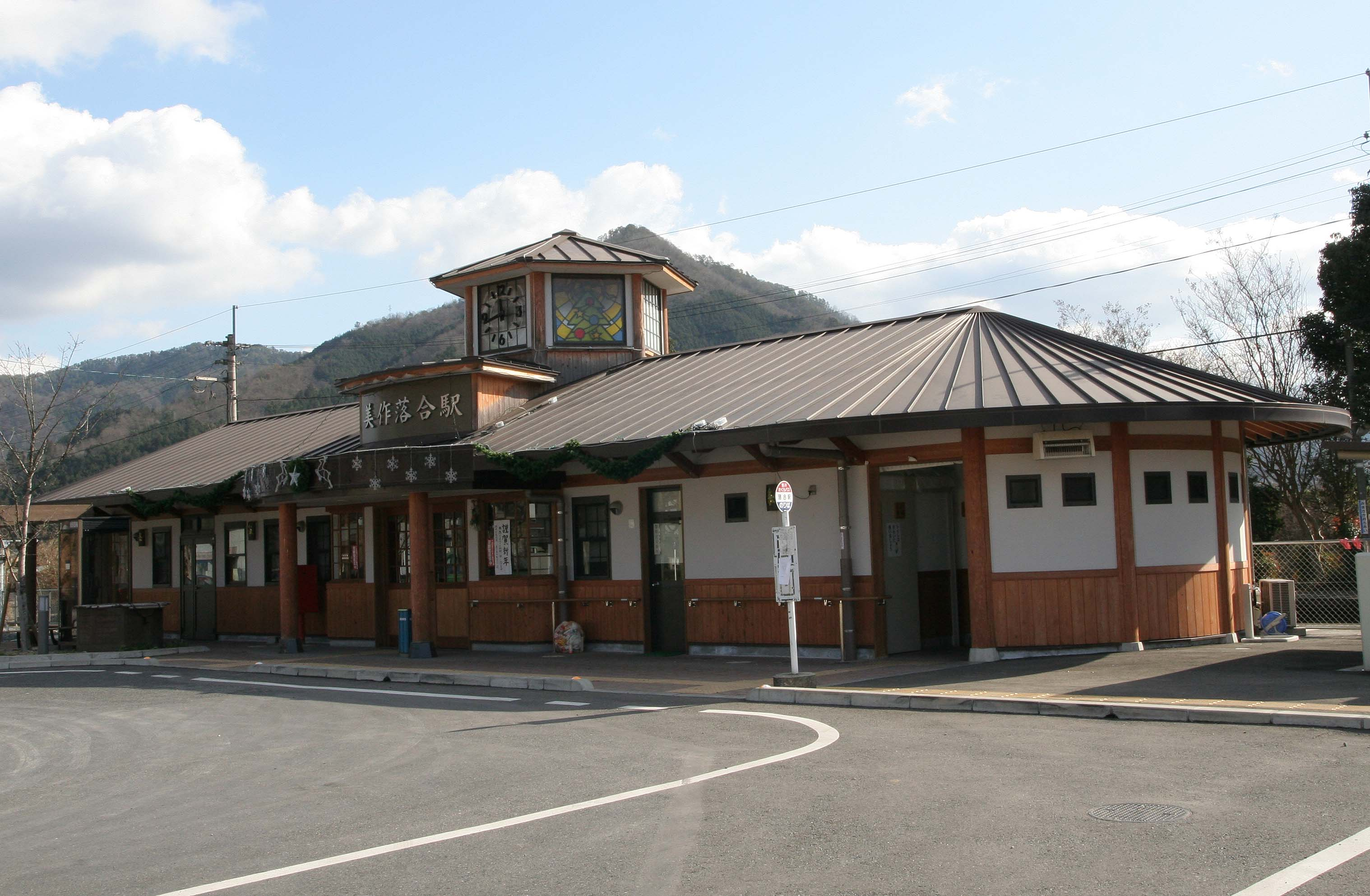
- Mimasaka-Ochiai Station, January 2008

General information
- Location: 398 Nishibara, Maniwa-shi, Okayama-ken 719-3105; Japan
- Coordinates: 35°1′23.5″N 133°45′34.75″E
- Owner: West Japan Railway Company
- Operator: West Japan Railway Company
- Line: K Kishin Line
- Distance: 110.9 km (68.9 miles) from Himeji
- Platforms: 2 side platforms
- Connections: Bus stop

Other information
- Status: Staffed
- Website: Official website

History
- Opened: 1 May 19240; 26 years ago

Passengers
- FY2019: 221 daily
Location
- Location within Okayama Prefecture Location within Japan

Mimasaka-Ochiai Station (美作落合駅, Mimasaka-Ochiai-eki) is a passenger railway station located in the city of Maniwa, Okayama Prefecture, Japan, operated by West Japan Railway Company (JR West).

== Lines ==
Mimasaka-Ochiai Station is served by the Kishin Line, and is located 110.9 kilometers from the southern terminus of the line at Himeji.

== Station layout ==
The station consists of two opposed ground-level side platforms. The station building is located on the side of the platform bound for Tsuyama, and both platforms are connected by a footbridge.The station is staffed. There is a station building built in May 2005.. The station is unattended.

=== Platforms ===
| 1 | ■ Kishin Line | for Tsuyama, Sayo |
| 2 | ■ Kishin Line | for Niimi |

== Adjacent stations ==
| « | Service | » |
JR West Kishin Line
| Tsuboi | Rapid | Komi |
| Mimasaka-Oiwake | Local | Komi |

== History ==
Mimasaka-Ochiai Station opened on May 1, 1924. With the privatization of the Japan National Railways (JNR) on April 1, 1987, the station came under the aegis of the West Japan Railway Company. The station building was rebuilt in 1994.

== Passenger statistics ==
In fiscal 2019, the station was used by an average of 221 passengers daily.

== Surrounding area ==
- Maniwa City Hall Ochiai Branch Office (former Ochiai Town Hall)
- Okayama Prefectural Ochiai High School
- Maniwa Municipal Ochiai Elementary School

== See also ==
- List of railway stations in Japan
