= Komi Station (Okayama) =

Railway station in Mainwa, Okayama Prefecture, Japan

Komi Station 古見駅
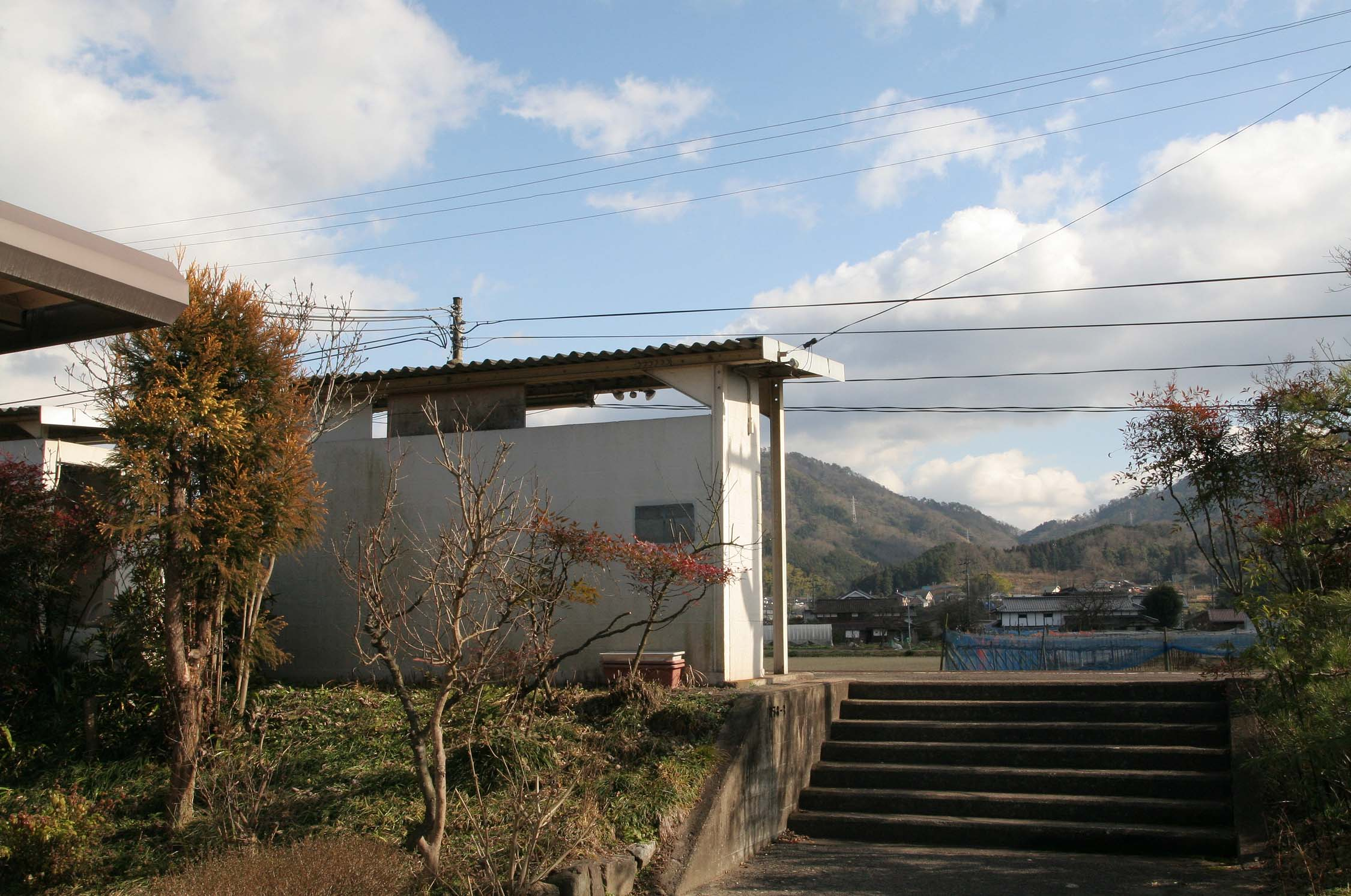
- Komi Station, January 2008

General information
- Location: Komi, Maniwa-shi, Okayama-ken 719-3103; Japan
- Coordinates: 35°2′57.19″N 133°45′38.25″E
- Owner: West Japan Railway Company
- Operator: West Japan Railway Company
- Line: K Kishin Line
- Distance: 114.6 km (71.2 miles) from Himeji
- Platforms: 1 side platform
- Connections: Bus stop

Other information
- Status: Unstaffed
- Website: Official website

History
- Opened: 1 April 1958; 68 years ago

Passengers
- FY2019: 69 daily
Location
- Location within Okayama Prefecture Location within Japan

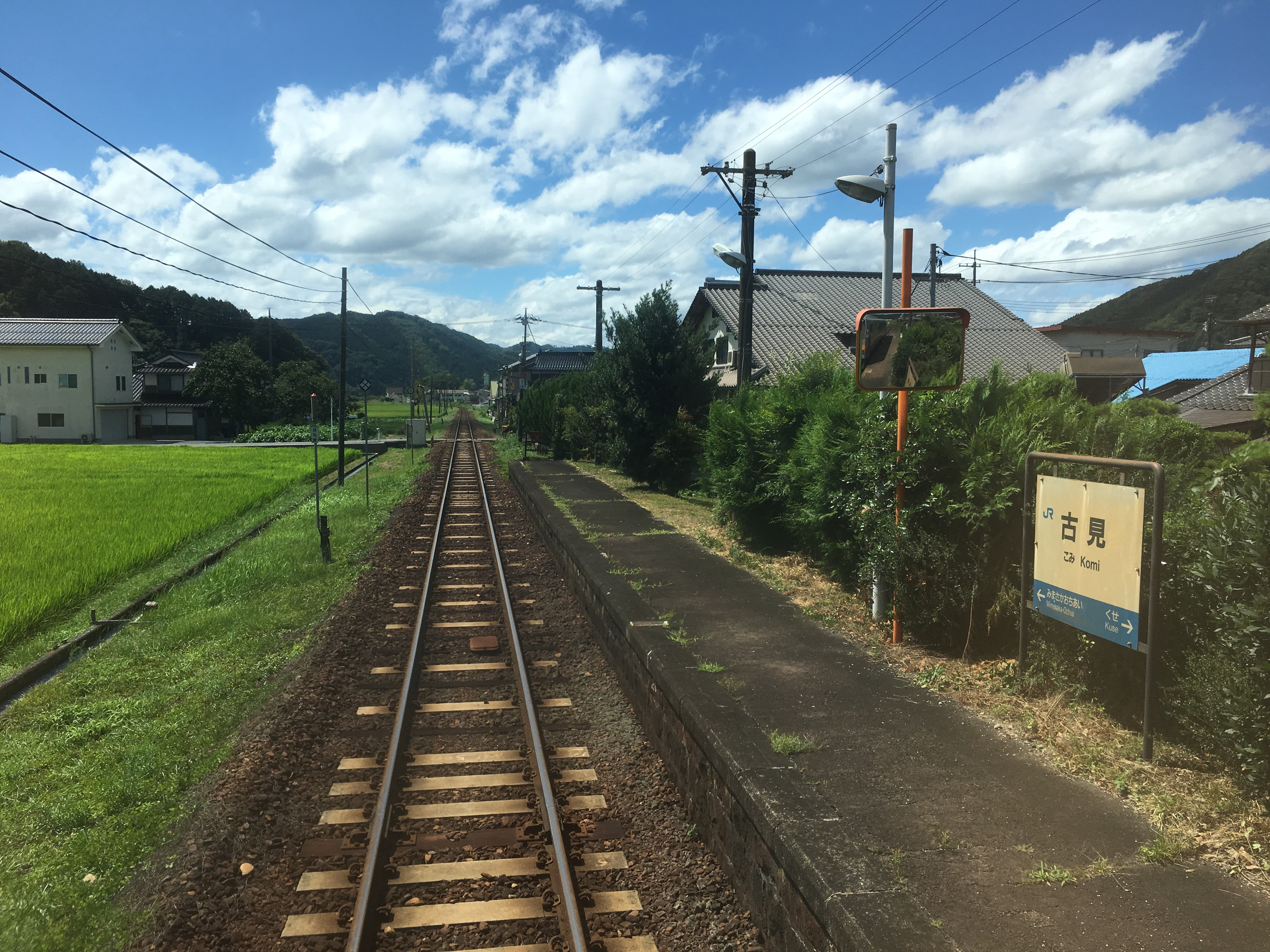
Station platform

Komi Station (古見駅, Komi-eki) is a passenger railway station located in the city of Maniwa, Okayama Prefecture, Japan, operated by West Japan Railway Company (JR West).

== Lines ==
Komi Station is served by the Kishin Line, and is located 114.6 kilometers from the southern terminus of the line at Himeji.

== Station layout ==
The station consists of one ground-level side platform serving a single bi-directional track. There is no station building, but only a rain shelter on the platform. The station is unattended.

== Adjacent stations ==
| « | Service | » |
JR West Kishin Line
| Mimasaka-Ochiai | Rapid | Kuse |
| Mimasaka-Ochiai | Local | Kuse |

== History ==
Komi Station opened on April 1, 1958. With the privatization of the Japan National Railways (JNR) on April 1, 1987, the station came under the aegis of the West Japan Railway Company.

== Passenger statistics ==
In fiscal 2019, the station was used by an average of 69 passengers daily.

== Surrounding area ==
- Asahi River
- Japan National Route 313

== See also ==
- List of railway stations in Japan
