= Kuse Station =

Railway station in Mainwa, Okayama Prefecture, Japan

Kuse Station 久世駅
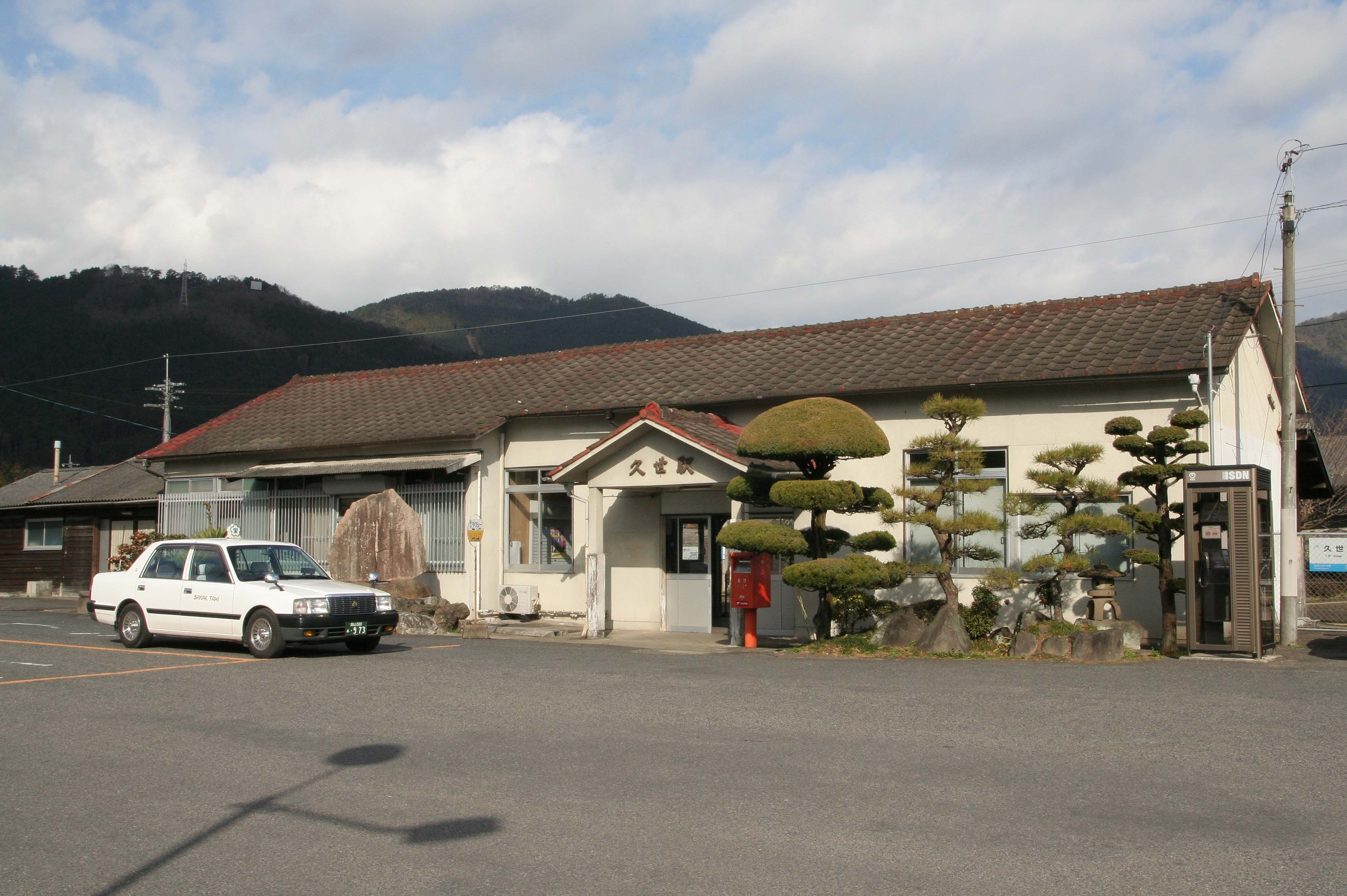
- Kuse Station, January 2008

General information
- Location: 2426-3 Kuse, Maniwa-shi, Okayama-ken 719-3201; Japan
- Coordinates: 35°4′51″N 133°44′43.32″E
- Owner: West Japan Railway Company
- Operator: West Japan Railway Company
- Line: K Kishin Line
- Distance: 118.9 km (73.9 miles) from Himeji
- Platforms: 2 side platforms
- Connections: Bus stop

Other information
- Status: Unstaffed
- Website: Official website

History
- Opened: 1 May 1924; 102 years ago

Passengers
- FY2019: 187 daily
Location
- Location within Okayama Prefecture Location within Japan

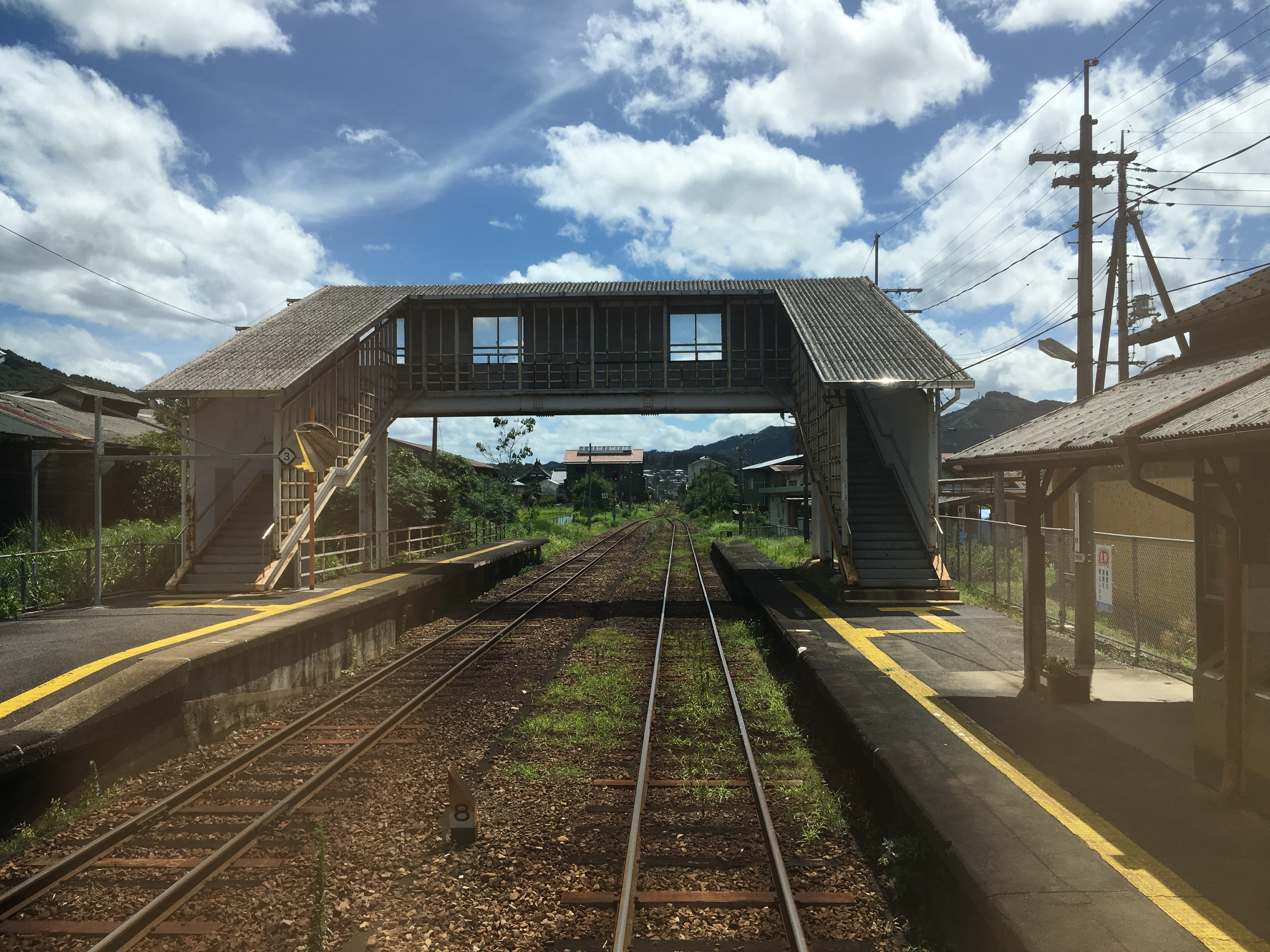
Station platforms

Kuse Station (久世駅, Kuse-eki) is a passenger railway station located in the city of Maniwa, Okayama Prefecture, Japan, operated by West Japan Railway Company (JR West).

== Lines ==
Kuse Station is served by the Kishin Line, and is located 118.9 kilometers from the southern terminus of the line at Himeji.

== Station layout ==
The station consists of two opposed ground-level side platforms connected by a footbridge. The station is unattended.

=== Platforms ===
1	■ Kishin Line	for Chūgoku-Katsuyama, Niimi
2	■ Kishin Line	for Tsuyama, Sayo

== Adjacent stations ==
«	Service	»
JR West Kishin Line
Komi	Rapid	Chūgoku-Katsuyama
Komi	Local	Chūgoku-Katsuyama

== History ==
Kuse Station opened on May 1, 1924. With the privatization of the Japan National Railways (JNR) on April 1, 1987, the station came under the aegis of the West Japan Railway Company.

== Passenger statistics ==
In fiscal 2019, the station was used by an average of 187 passengers daily.

== Surrounding area ==
- Maniwa City Hall Main Office
- Okayama Prefectural Maniwa High School Kuze Campus

== See also ==
- List of railway stations in Japan
