= Mimasaka-Oiwake Station =

Railway station in Mainwa, Okayama Prefecture, Japan

Mimasaka-Oiwake 美作追分
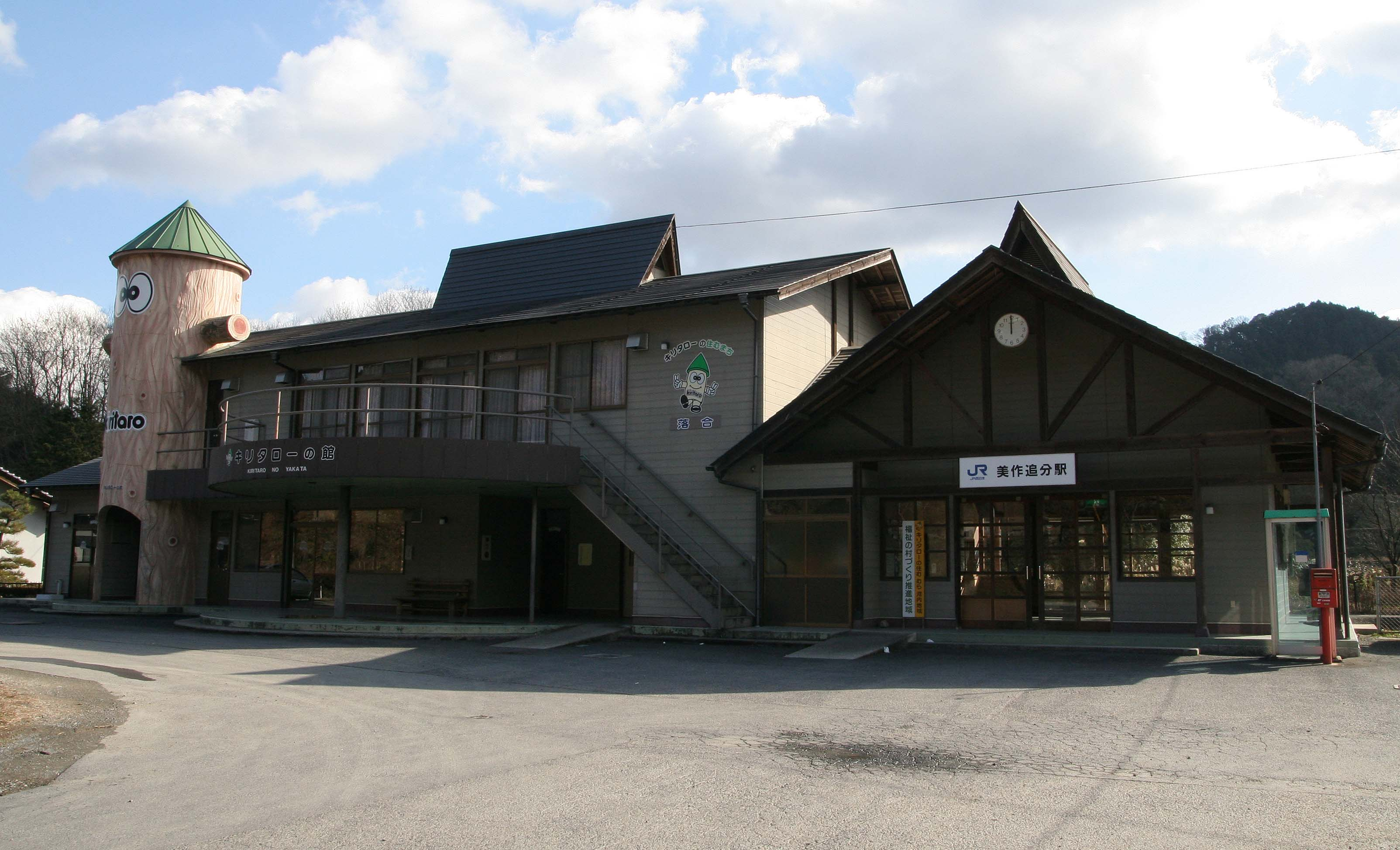
- Mimasaka-Oiwake Station, January 2008

General information
- Location: Kamigouchi, Maniwa-shi, Okayama-ken 719-3121; Japan
- Coordinates: 35°3′31.89″N 133°49′12.13″E
- Owner: West Japan Railway Company
- Operator: West Japan Railway Company
- Line: K Kishin Line
- Distance: 103.9 km (64.6 miles) from Himeji
- Platforms: 1 side platform
- Connections: Bus stop

Other information
- Status: Unstaffed
- Website: Official website

History
- Opened: 21 August 1923; 103 years ago

Passengers
- FY2019: 22 daily

Services
Preceding station	JR West	Following station
Mimasaka-Ochiai towards Niimi	Kishin Line Local	Tsuboi towards Himeji
Location
- Location within Okayama Prefecture Location within Japan

Mimasaka-Oiwake Station (美作追分駅, Mimasaka-Oiwake-eki) is a passenger railway station located in the city of Maniwa, Okayama Prefecture, Japan, operated by West Japan Railway Company (JR West).

== Lines ==
Mimasaka-Oiwake Station is served by the Kishin Line, and is located 103.9 kilometers from the southern terminus of the line at Himeji.

== Station layout ==
The station consists of one ground-level side platform serving a single bi-directional track and a wooden station building. The station is unattended.

== History ==
Mimasaka-Oiwake Station opened on August 21, 1923. With the privatization of the Japan National Railways (JNR) on April 1, 1987, the station came under the aegis of the West Japan Railway Company. The station building was rebuilt in 1994.

== Passenger statistics ==
In fiscal 2019, the station was used by an average of 22 passengers daily.

== See also ==
- List of railway stations in Japan
