= Okutsu, Okayama =

Dissolved municipality in Okayama prefecture, Japan

Okutsu (奥津町, Okutsu-chō) was a town located in Tomata District, Okayama Prefecture, Japan.

== Population ==
As of 2003 (before the merger), the village had an estimated population of 1,732 and a density of 13.24 persons per km^{2}. The total area was 130.83 km^{2}.

== Merge ==
On March 1, 2005, Okutsu, along with the villages of Kamisaibara and Tomi (all from Tomata District), was merged into the expanded town of Kagamino.
