= Tsuboi Station =

Railway station in Tsuyama, Okayama Prefecture, Japan

Tsuboi Station 坪井駅
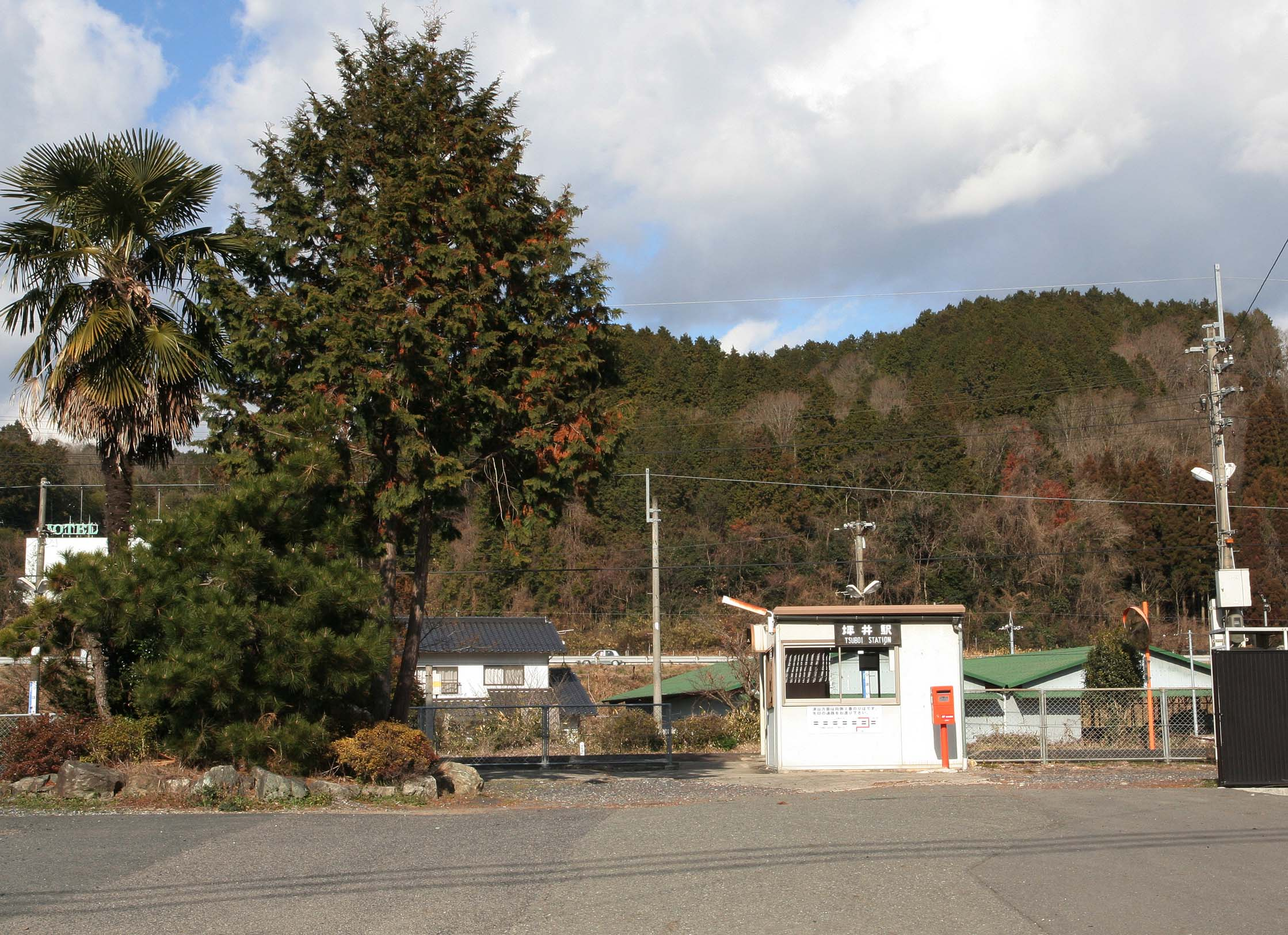
- Tsuboi Station, January 2008

General information
- Location: Nakakitakami, Tsuyama-shi, Okayama-ken 709-4606; Japan
- Coordinates: 35°3′43.42″N 133°52′38.46″E
- Owner: West Japan Railway Company
- Operator: West Japan Railway Company
- Line: K Kishin Line
- Distance: 98.3 km (61.1 miles) from Himeji
- Platforms: 2 side platforms
- Connections: Bus stop

Other information
- Status: Unstaffed
- Website: Official website

History
- Opened: 21 August 1923; 103 years ago

Passengers
- FY2019: 24 daily
Location
- Location within Okayama Prefecture Location within Japan

Tsuboi Station (坪井駅, Tsuboi-eki) is a passenger railway station located in the city of Tsuyama, Okayama Prefecture, Japan, operated by West Japan Railway Company (JR West).

== Lines ==
Tsuboi Station is served by the Kishin Line, and is located 98.3 kilometers from the southern terminus of the line at Himeji.

== Station layout ==
The station consists of two opposed ground-level side platforms connected to the station building by a level crossing. The station is unattended.

=== Platforms ===
1	■ K Kishin Line	for Chūgoku-Katsuyama, Niimi
2	■ K Kishin Line	for Tsuyama, Sayo

== Adjacent stations ==
«	Service	»
JR West Kishin Line
Mimasaka-Sendai	Rapid	Mimasaka-Ochiai
Mimasaka-Sendai	Local	Mimasaka-Oiwake

== History ==
Tsuboi Station opened on August 21, 1923. With the privatization of the Japan National Railways (JNR) on April 1, 1987, the station came under the aegis of the West Japan Railway Company.

== Passenger statistics ==
In fiscal 2019, the station was used by an average of 24 passengers daily.

== Surrounding area ==
- Japan National Route 181
- Chugoku Expressway
- Tsuyama Municipal Nakasho Elementary School

== See also ==
- List of railway stations in Japan
