= Kamisaibara, Okayama =

Dissolved municipality in Okayama prefecture, Japan

Kamisaibara (上齋原村, Kamisaibara-son) was a village located in Tomata District, Okayama Prefecture, Japan.

As of 2003 (before the merger), the village had an estimated population of 914 and a density of 10.10 persons per km^{2}. The total area was 90.49 km^{2}.

On March 1, 2005, Kamisaibara, along with the town of Okutsu, and the village of Tomi (all from Tomata District), was merged into the expanded town of Kagamino.

Kamisaibara is the site of the first discovery of an outcropping of uranium ore within Japan. After discovery, the Ningyō-tōge Office of Atomic Fuel Corporation (now called the Ningyō-tōge Environmental Engineering Center of the Japan Atomic Energy Agency) was built in 1957. The site has been involved in the "development of front-end technologies for the nuclear fuel cycle, namely, uranium exploration, uranium mining, refining, and enrichment."
