= Satsuki azalea =

Japanese azalea cultivar group

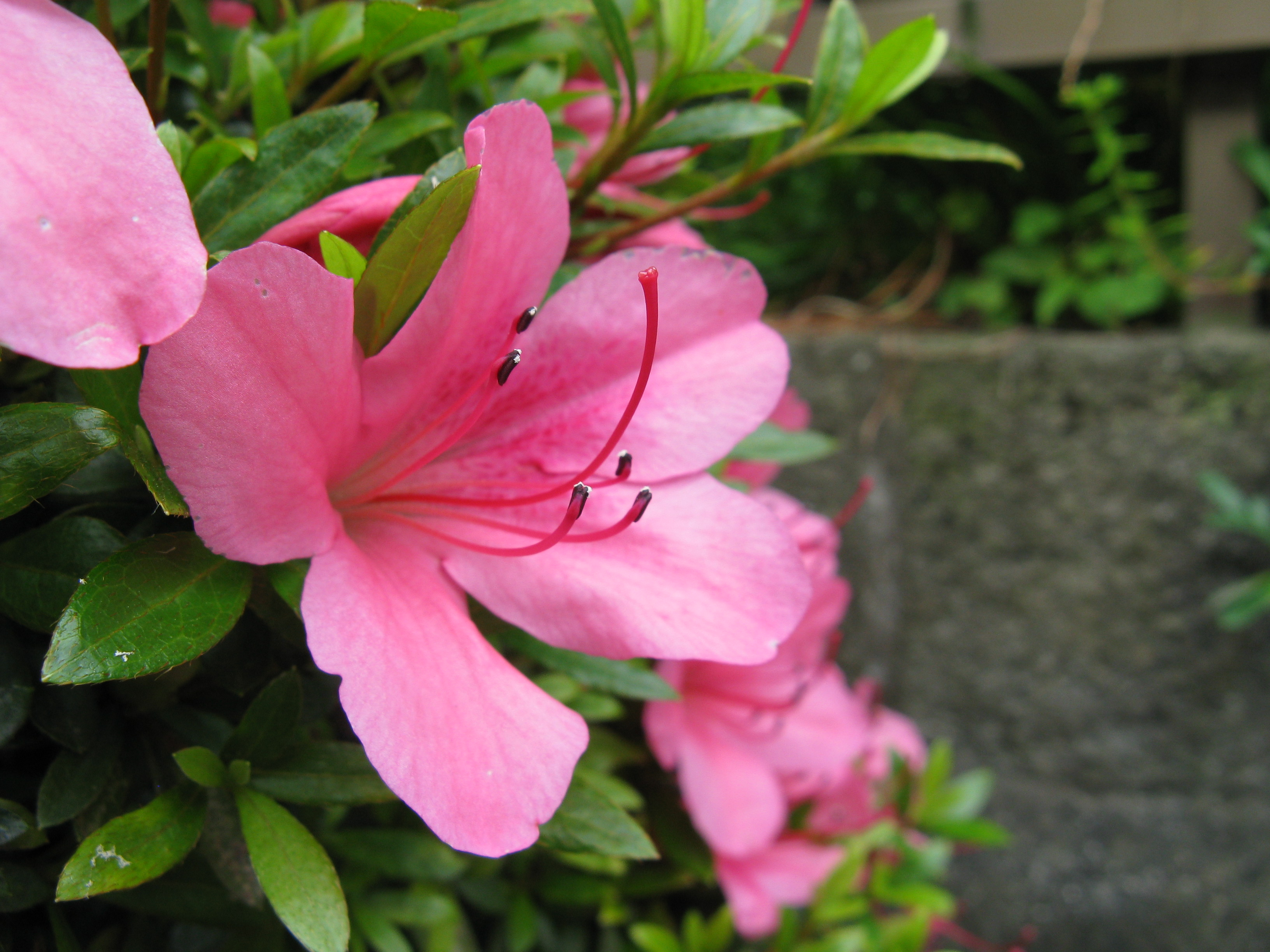
- Genus: Rhododendron
- Origin: Japan

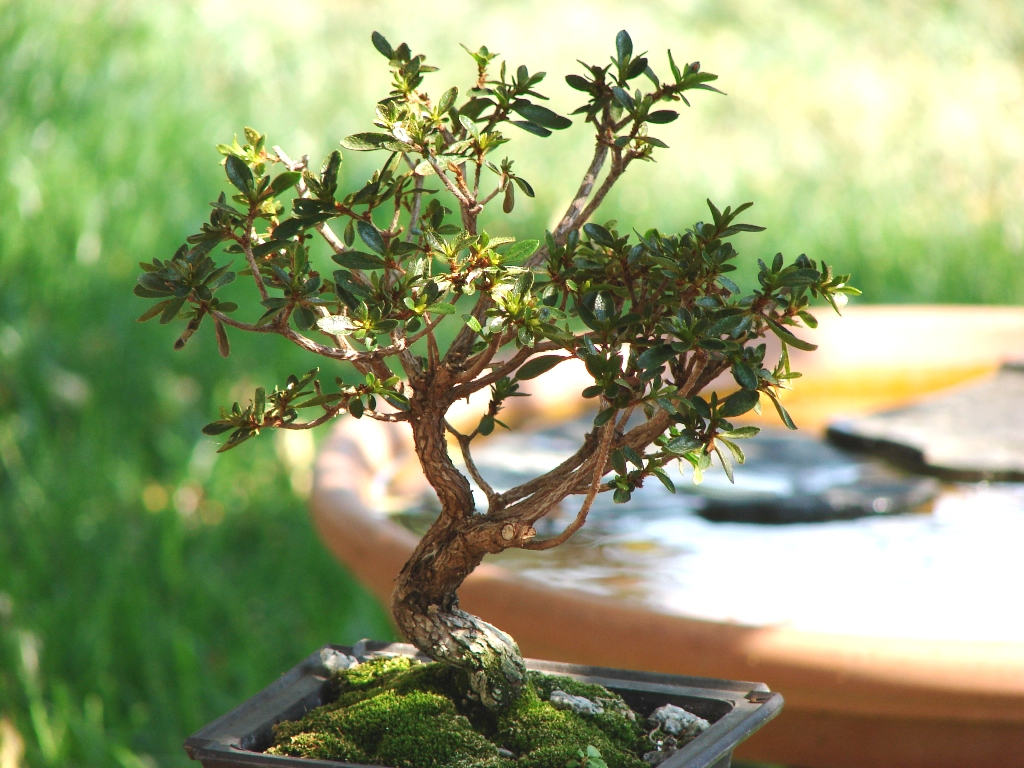
Satsuki azalea bonsai, 3.5" tall

Satsuki azalea is a cultivar group of the genus Rhododendron, a type of azalea extensively cultivated and hybridized by the Japanese. It is native to the mountains of Japan.

Satsuki azaleas have a diverse range of flower forms and color patterns with multiple patterns often appearing on a single plant. Satsuki bloom from May to June; the name “Satsuki” in Japanese is reference to their blooming period, the fifth month of the Asian lunar calendar. They are commonly used as a subject in bonsai and many bonsai enthusiasts and shows are dedicated solely to them. There are thousands of different varieties, but some popular ones are Chinzan, Kaho, Gyoten, Osakasuki, Eikan, Nikko, Hakurei, Hakurin, Kinsai, and many more.

== Description ==
Satsuki evergreen azaleas have been hybridized in Japan for at least 500 years. The first Satsuki were probably natural hybrids of Rhododendron indicum and Rhododendron tamurae. In general, they are late-blooming (mid-May and June), with 1 to 5 inch single flowers, although some have hose-in-hose, semi-double and fully double flowers. Satsuki flower shapes range from rounded overlapping lobes to narrow wide-spaced lobes, with lobe edges ranging from flat to frilled.

Flower colors vary from white to pink, yellowish pink, red, reddish orange and purple. Color patterns include solids, and stripes, flakes, lines, sectors and margins of color on a lighter background. The complete range of color patterns can appear on the same plant, differently each year. These color patterns are highly prized by the Japanese, and have been carefully described and classified starting as early as 1692 in the book "A Brocade Pillow, azaleas of old Japan", by author Ito Ihei, a nurseryman and gardener for the feudal lords.

Satsuki foliage length varies from about 1/2 inch to 2 inches, with shapes ranging from lanceolate to obovate to ovate. A few have contorted twisted leaves, and another few have variegated leaves, either blotched or margined with yellow.

Most Satsuki are compact, twiggy, slow growing plants, ranging from low and spreading to about 5 or 6 feet high in 10 or 15 years. The plants are usually rounded in shape, although some are upright and some are pendulous.

Most Satsuki are cold-hardy to 0°F, with a few hardy to -10°F. They should be sited with protection from afternoon sun.

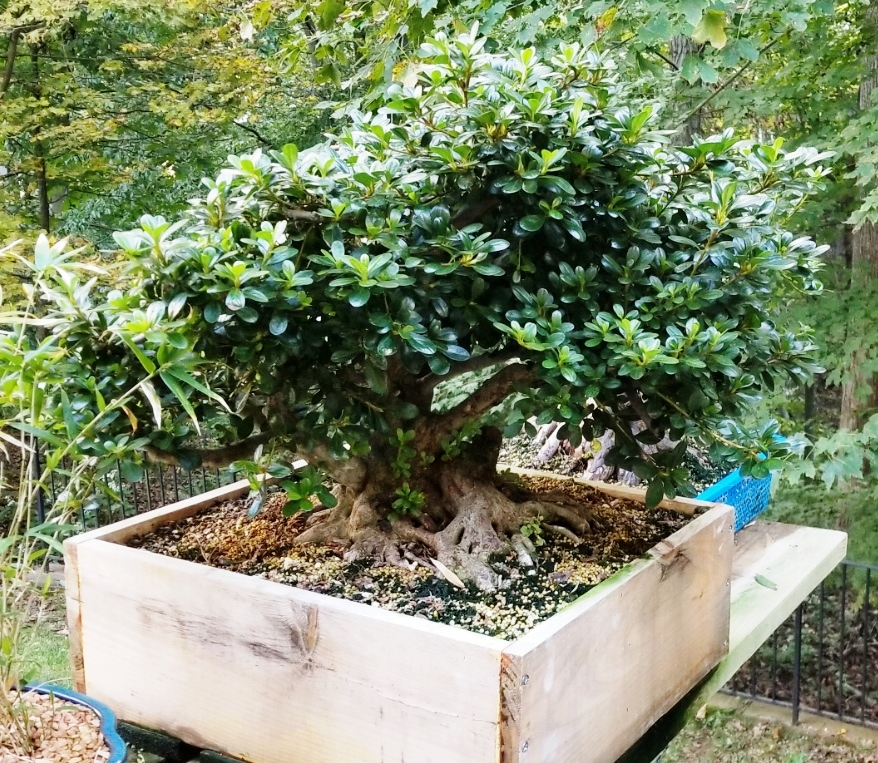
Satsuki Azalea being developed as a bonsai. This 30-year old Satsuki is the 'Eishi' hybrid, planted in pure Kanuma soil on a wooden box to encourage root growth. Before starting as a bonsai the plant had been growing in the ground.

== Satsuki as Bonsai ==
Satsuki azaleas are popular bonsai plants for many reasons. They can take a hard pruning, the flowers vary in color, shape and size, and they take well to pot culture. Azaleas prefer acidic soil. They are basally-dominant plants, unlike other plants used in bonsai which are apically dominant.

Satsuki azaleas are typically cultivated in a specialty soil called Kanuma, which is an incredibly soft, acidic, volcanic soil. This soil accommodates the fine, soft, steel wool-like root system that Satsuki azaleas utilize for their water conductivity and nutrient uptake.

The best time to repot is after blooming is finished. Repotting can also be done in the late fall, but with care. Flowers take a tremendous amount of energy from the plant so it is best to remove all the flowers, old and new, and the remaining buds, all at the same time; Taking this step will ensure that the following year, the buds will open at the same time.
