= Kagamino =

Kagamino 鏡野町
- Town
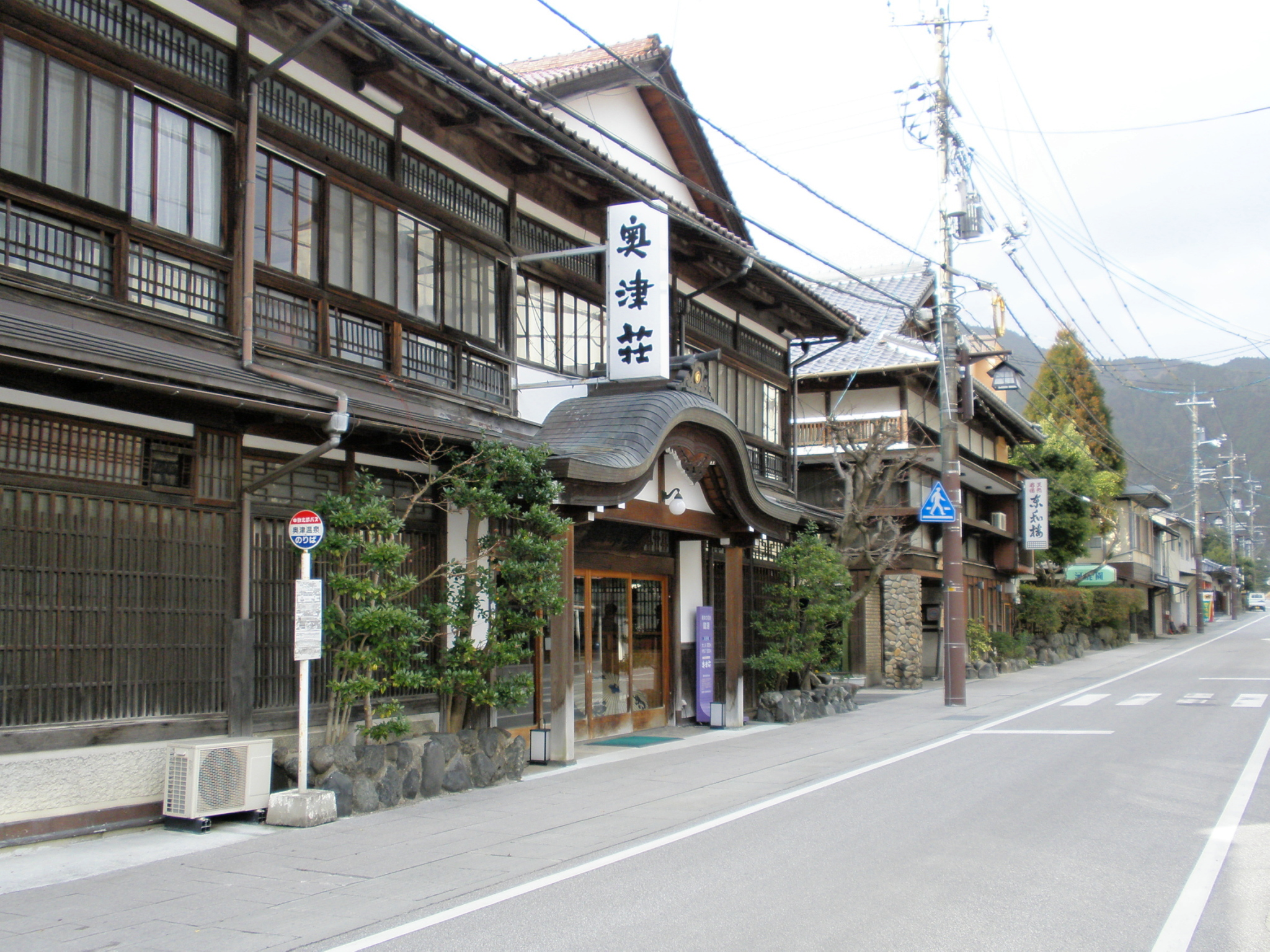
- Okutsu Onsen in Kagamino

- Flag Emblem
- Interactive map of Kagamino
- Location in Japan
- Coordinates: 35°05′31″N 133°55′59″E
- Country: Japan
- Region: Chūgoku; San'yō
- Prefecture: Okayama
- District: Tomata

Area
  - Total: 419.68 km^{2} (162.04 sq mi)

Population (January 31, 2023)
  - Total: 12,425
  - Density: 29.606/km^{2} (76.679/sq mi)
- Time zone: UTC+09:00 (JST)
- City hall address: 660 Takeda, Kagamino-cho, Tomata-gun, Okayama-ken 708-0392
- Website: Official website
- Symbols
- Bird: Crested kingfisher
- Butterfly: Byasa alcinous, Luehdorfia japonica
- Flower: Gentiana scabra, Sakura
- Tree: Fagaceae

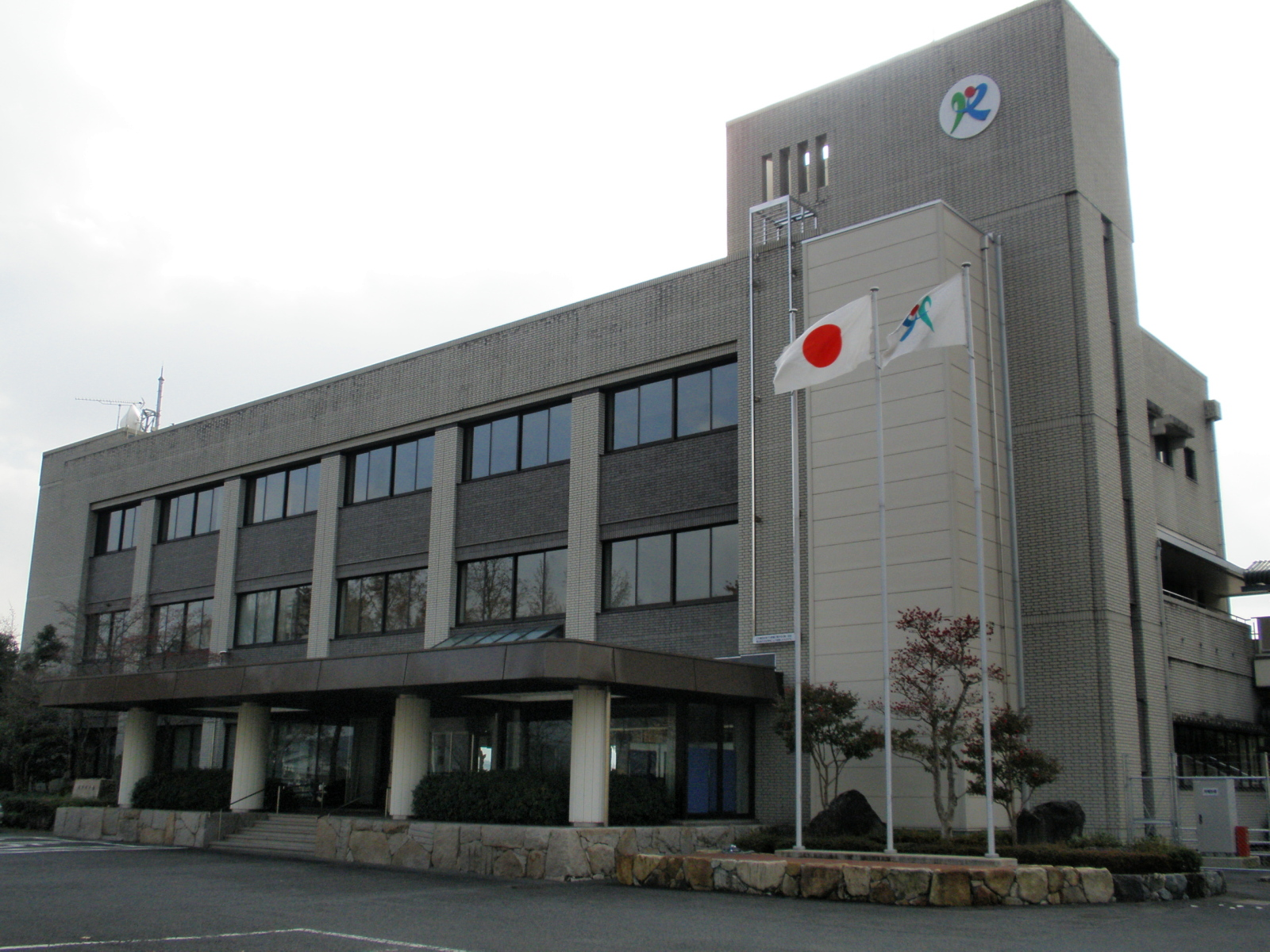
Kagamino Town Hall

Kagamino (鏡野町, Kagamino-chō) is a town located in Tomata District, Okayama Prefecture, Japan. As of 31 January 2023, the town had an estimated population of 12,425 in 5633 households and a population density of 30 persons per km^{2}. The total area of the town is 419.68 square kilometres (162.04 sq mi).

== Geography ==
Kagamino is located in north-central Okayama Prefecture. The Chugoku Mountains form its northern border with Tottori prefecture, with peaks of 1000 meters or more. The southern part of the town is located at the western edge of the Tsuyama Basin, and the Yoshii River flows through the center of the town from north to south.

=== Neighboring municipalities ===
Okayama Prefecture

- Maniwa
- Tsuyama

Tottori Prefecture

- Tottori (city)
- Misasa

== Climate ==
Kagamino has a humid subtropical climate (Köppen Cfa) characterized by warm summers and cool winters with heavy snowfall. The average annual temperature in Kagamino is 13.4 °C. The average annual rainfall is 1501 mm with September as the wettest month. The temperatures are highest on average in January, at around 25.3 °C, and lowest in January, at around 1.7 °C.

== Demography ==
Per Japanese census data, the population of Kagamino has been declining steadily since the 1950s.

Historical population
Year	Pop.	±%
1920	21,463	—
1930	21,925	+2.2%
1940	20,984	−4.3%
1950	26,126	+24.5%
1960	23,836	−8.8%
1970	18,280	−23.3%
1980	17,493	−4.3%
1990	16,500	−5.7%
2000	15,091	−8.5%
2010	13,575	−10.0%

== History ==
The area of Kagamino was part of ancient Mimasaka Province.The town of Kagamino was established by the merger of the villages of Yoshino, Ono, Oda, Nakatani, Kagami-Minami and Kagami-kita on November 10, 1952.

On March 1, 2005, Kagamino absorbed the town of Okutsu, and the villages of Kamisaibara and Tomi, from the Tomata District.

== Government ==
Kagamino has a mayor-council form of government with a directly elected mayor and a unicameral town council of 14 members. Kagamino, collectively with the city of Tsuyama and the towns of Nagi and Shōō, contributes four members to the Okayama Prefectural Assembly. In terms of national politics, the town is part of the Okayama 3rd district of the lower house of the Diet of Japan.

== Economy ==
The main industry in the area is agriculture and forestry. The Yamada Bee Farm Corporation, a noted honey producer, is headquartered in Kagamino.

== Education ==
Kagamino has eight public elementary schools and one public junior high school operated by the town government. The town does not have a high school.

== Transportation ==
=== Railway ===
Kagamino does not have any passenger rail service. The nearest train station is Innoshō Station on the JR West Kishin Line in the neighboring Tsuyama.

=== Highways ===
- National Route 179
- National Route 482

== Sister cities ==
Kagamino is twinned with:

- Yverdon-les-Bains, Switzerland

== Local attractions ==
- Okutsu Onsen, hot spring resort
