= Tomata District, Okayama =

District in Okayama prefecture, Japan

Coordinates: 35°12′36″N 133°53′53″E

Location of Tomata District in Okayama Prefecture

Tomata (苫田郡, Tomata-gun) is a district located in Okayama Prefecture, Japan.

As of 2003, the district has an estimated population of 20,631 and a population density of 33.22 persons per km^{2}. The total area is 621.03 km^{2}.

== Towns and villages ==
- Kagamino

== Merger ==
- On February 28, 2005 the town of Kamo, and the village of Aba merged into the city of Tsuyama.
- On March 1, 2005 the town of Okutsu, and the villages of Kamisaibara and Tomi were merged into the expanded town of Kagamino.

== See also ==
- Tomata Dam
