= Ryōgūzan Kofun =

5th century burial mound in Awaiwa, Okayama Prefecture, Japan

- 両宮山古墳 (Japanese)
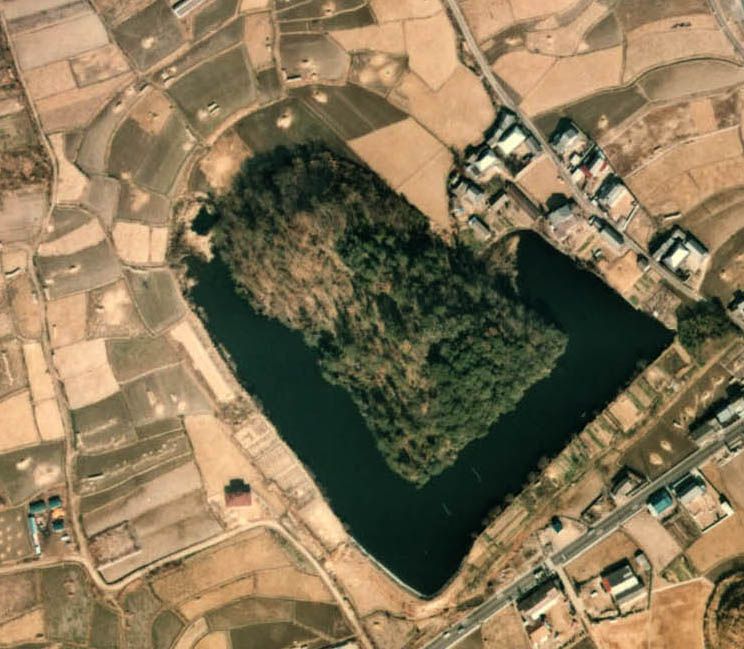
- Ryōgūzan Kofun

- Ryōgūzan Kofun Ryōgūzan Kofun (Japan)
- Interactive map of Ryōgūzan Kofun
- 34°44′23.2″N 134°00′9.36″E
- Type: Kofun
- Periods: Kofun period
- Location: Akaiwa, Okayama Prefecture, Japan
- Region: San'yō region

History
- Built: c.5th century

Site notes
- Public access: Yes (no facilities)

Ryōgūzan Kofun (両宮山古墳) is a Kofun period burial mound, located in the city of Awaiwa, Okayama Prefecture, in the San'in region of Japan. The tumulus was designated a National Historic Site of Japan in 1924 with the area under protection expanded in 1978 and again in 2006. It is largest keyhole-shaped burial mound in the Bizen region and the third largest in Okayama Prefecture, and the 39th largest in Japan.

== Overview ==
The Ryōgūzan Kofun is a zenpō-kōen-fun (前方後円墳), which is shaped like a keyhole, having one square end and one circular end, when viewed from above. It is part of the Ryōgūzan Kofun cluster (also known as the Nishi-Takatsuki Kofun cluster) which consists of four keyhole-shaped tombs and two scallop-shaped tombs, including this one.

Built in the latter half of the 5th century, or the middle of the Kofun period, the Ryōgūzan Kofun has a surrounding moat and a total length of 206 meters. An archaeological excavation from 2002 to 2004 discovered a new moat around the outside of the surrounding moat, revealing that the original construction had a double moat. Including the two surrounding moats, the total length of the burial mound reaches 349 meters on the main axis. The outer moat is buried under surrounding paddy fields, but the inner moat is still filled with water (and is used as a reservoir for agriculture). The tumulus itself is about 120 meters wide at the anterior rectangular portion, 100 meter in diameter at the posterior circular portion, and about 20 meters high at both portions. No fukiishi or haniwa have been found. Since the tumulus itself has not been excavated, the details of the burial chamber are is unknown. The dimensions of the tumulus appear to be based on a two-fifths scale of the Daisenryō Kofun (tomb of Emperor Nintoku in Sakai, Osaka), and indicates that the person buried at the Ryōgūzan Kofun was an influential person with strong ties to theYamato kingdom.

To the north of the Ryōgūzan Kofun is a baizuka ancillary burial mound, the Wada Chausuyama Kofun (和田茶臼山古墳), with a diameter of about 20 meters and a height of about 5 meters. This smaller tumulus also originally had a double moat, although it appears that part of its outer moat was shared with that of the Ryōgūzan Kofun. Currently, only the round rear part of the mound remains, but excavations confirmed the front part once existed. As with the Ryōgūzan Kofun, no fukiishi and haniwa have been found. It is estimated to have been built in the latter half of the 5th century.

The tumulus is about 10 minutes by car from JR West Seto Station. The Bizen Kokubun-ji ruins are located on the west side of Ryōgūzan Kofun.

== Gallery ==
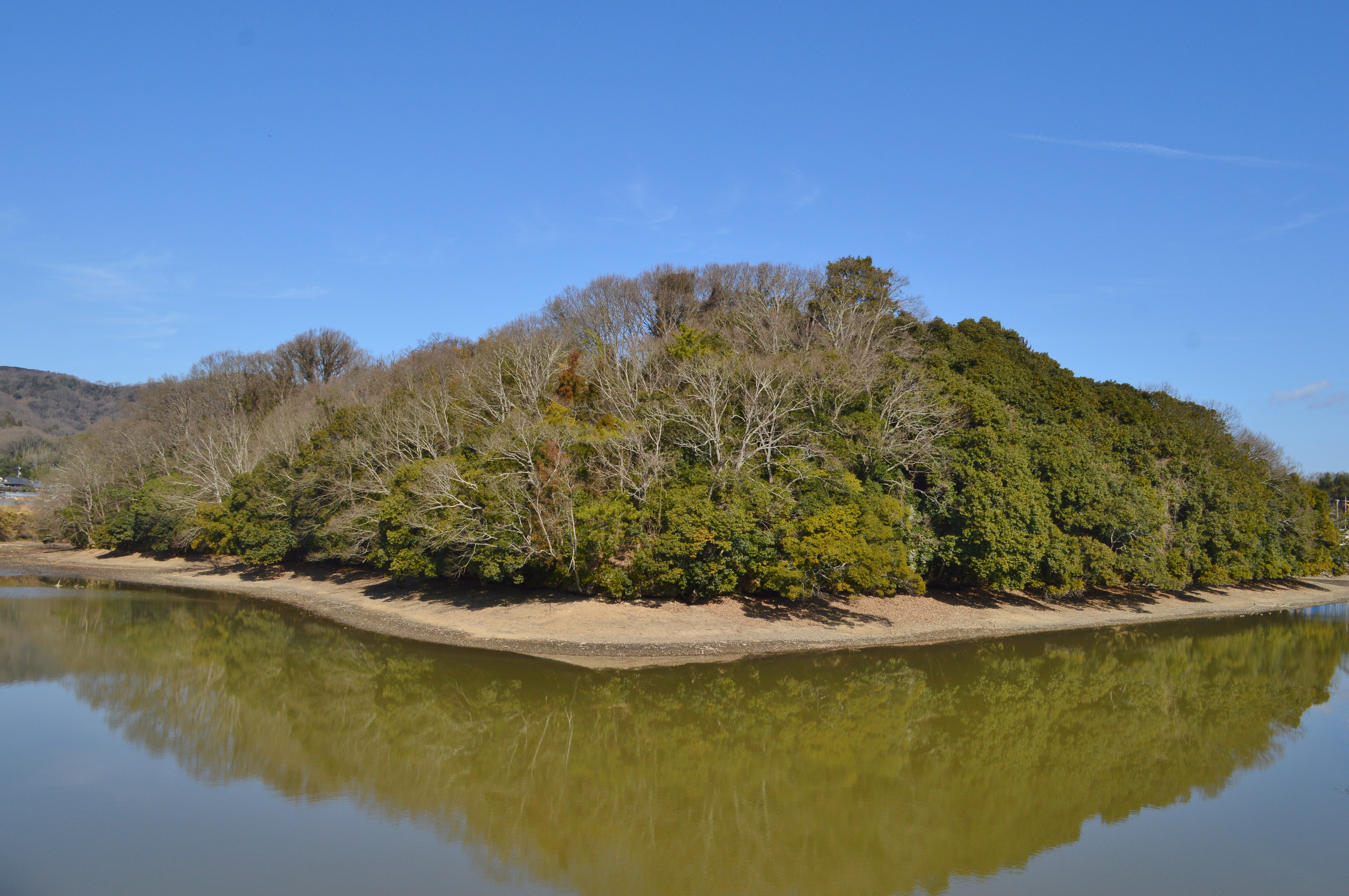
Panoramic view

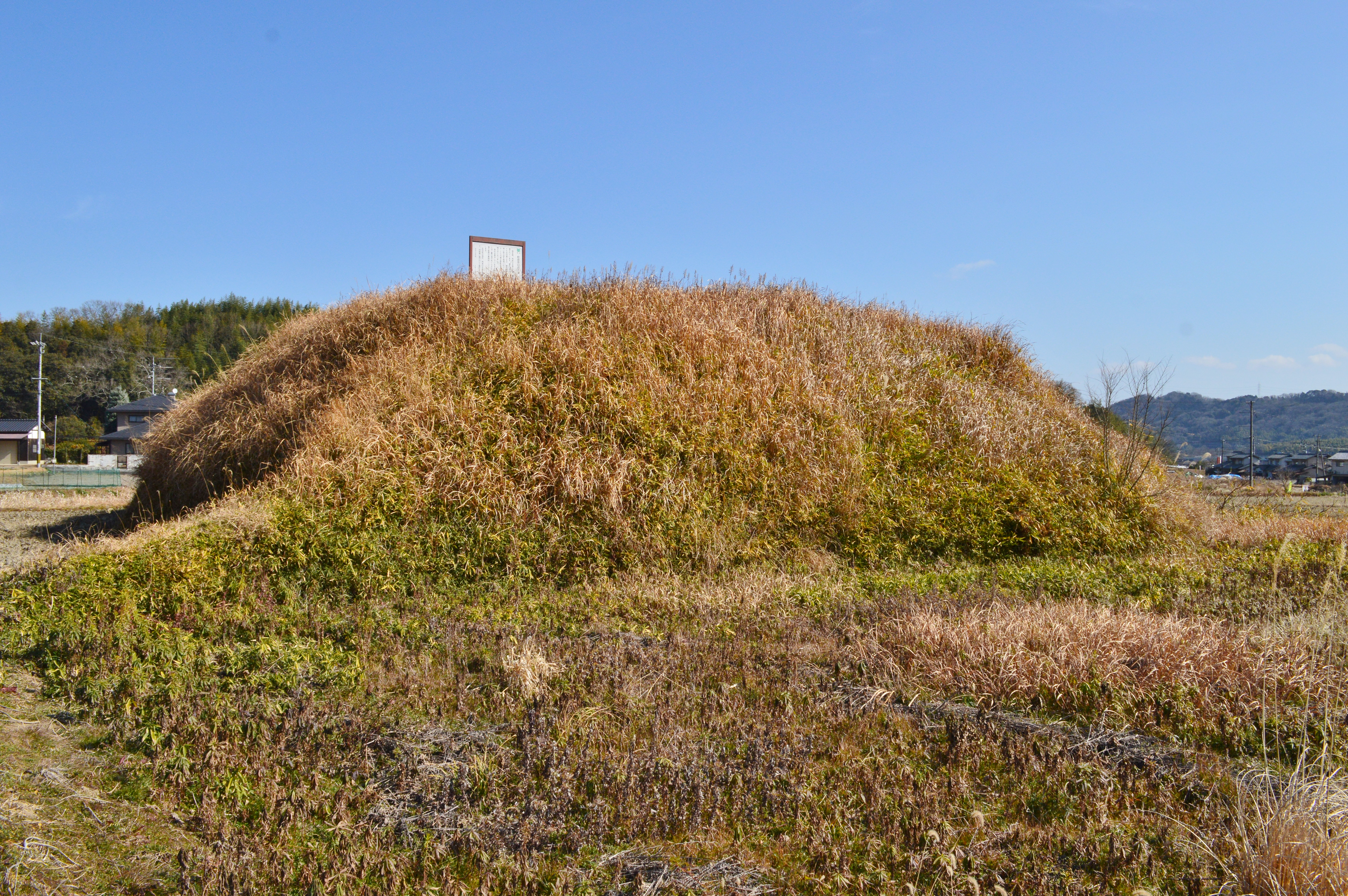
Wada Chausuyama Kofun

== See also ==
- List of Historic Sites of Japan (Okayama)
