= Kumayama, Okayama =

Dissolved municipality in Okayama prefecture, Japan

Kumayama (熊山町, Kumayama-chō) was a town located in Akaiwa District, Okayama Prefecture, Japan.

As of 2003, the town had an estimated population of 8,854 and a density of 193.61 persons per km^{2}. The total area was 45.73 km^{2}.

On March 7, 2005, Kumayama, along with the towns of Akasaka, San'yō and Yoshii (all from Akaiwa District), were merged to create the city of Akaiwa.
