= Akasaka, Okayama =

Dissolved municipality in Okayama prefecture, Japan

Akasaka (赤坂町, Akasaka-chō) was a town located in Akaiwa District, Okayama Prefecture, Japan.

As of 2003, the town had an estimated population of 5,136 and a density of 119.47 persons per km^{2}. The total area was 42.99 km^{2}.

On March 7, 2005, Akasaka, along with the towns of Kumayama, San'yō and Yoshii (all from Akaiwa District), were merged to create the city of Akaiwa.

Akasaka was home to many restaurants and small shops. It is also home to the local shinto Hie (Sanno) Shrine.
