= Bizen Kokubun-ji =

Historic religious ruin in Akaishi, Okayama, Japan

- 備前国分寺 (Japanese)
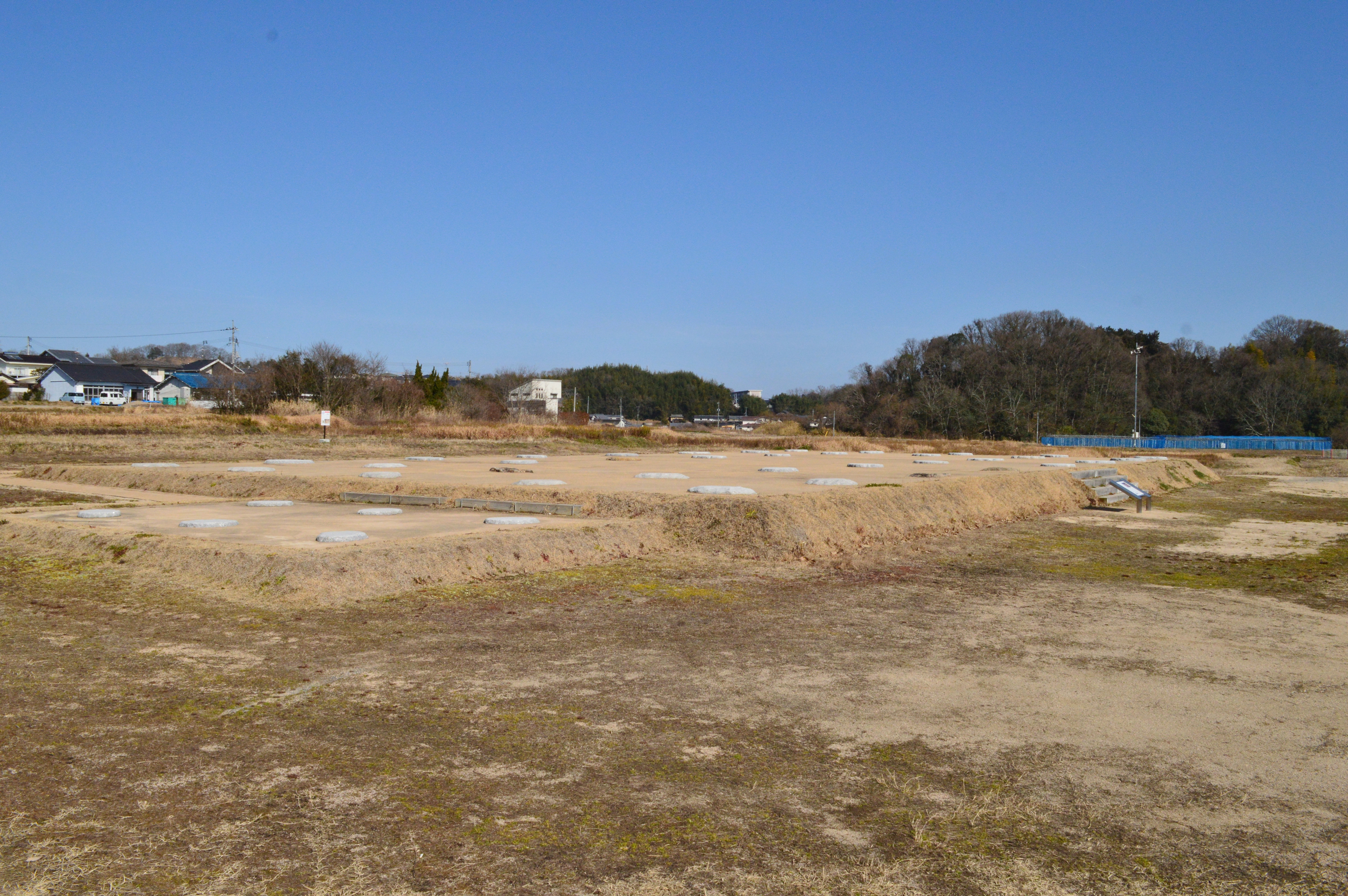
- Foundations of the Lecture Hall

- Location within Okayama Prefecture Location within Japan
- 34°44′18.19″N 133°59′57.75″E
- Type: Buddhist temple ruins
- Location: Akaiwa, Okayama, Japan

History
- Founder: Emperor Shōmu
- National Historic Site of Japan

The Bizen Kokubun-ji (備前国分寺) was a Buddhist temple located in what is now the city of Akaiwa, Okayama, Japan. It was one of the provincial temples per the system established by Emperor Shōmu during the Nara period (710 – 794) for the purpose of promoting Buddhism as the national religion of Japan and standardising imperial rule over the provinces. The temple no longer exists, but the temple grounds were designated as a National Historic Site in 1975.

== Overview ==
The Shoku Nihongi records that in 741 AD, as the country recovered from a major smallpox epidemic, Emperor Shōmu ordered that a state-subsidized monastery and nunnery be established in every province for the promotion of Buddhism and to enhance political unification per the new ritsuryō system. These were the kokubunji (国分寺). The temples were constructed per a more-or-less standardized template, and were each to be staffed by twenty clerics who would pray for the state's protection. The associated provincial nunneries (kokubunniji) were on a smaller scale, each housing ten nuns to pray for the atonement of sins. This system declined when the capital was moved from Nara to Kyoto in 794 AD.

== History ==
The Bizen Kokubun-ji temple site is located in the Umaya neighborhood of the city Akaiwa, on an alluvial fan between the Yoshii River and the Asahi River. The route of the ancient San'yōdō highway runs through the southern part of the temple grounds. Currently, Kokubunji Hachimangū Shrine is located in the center of the western portion of the former temple grounds. The temple's location was confirmed by an archaeological excavation in 1974, when the site was slated for development as a housing estate. Further excavation were conducted in the year 2003. During these excavations, the foundations of the South gate, Middle gate, Kondō, Lecture Hall, and priest's quarters were found to be aligned in a straight line from south to north within a 175 meters (east-to-west) by 190 meters (north-to-south) walled compound. The South gate and the Middle gate were situated very close to each other, which is an unusual layout of the temple.

The actual foundation date for this temple is uncertain, but it believed to have been built around the time of the imperial edict for the construction of the kokubunji temples in 741. Its name appears in the early Heian period Engishiki records, and it is believed that renovations were made in the 10th century, but that the Lecture Hall and northern portion of the cloister was destroyed by a fire around the mid- to late-12th century. It is presumed that the pagoda and perhaps even the Main Hall were also lost around this time. Archaeological evidence suggests that a new Main Hall was constructed in the northeastern corner of the original Lecture Hall site in the early Kamakura period. A seven-story stone pagoda that is believed to have been built in the early Kamakura period still stands on the site of the original Nara-period pagoda. This pagoda is a designated Tangible Cultural Property of Akaiwa city.

By the Edo Period, the site had disappeared under paddy fields, and a nearby temple called Enjū-ji claimed to be the successor of the Bizen Kokubun-ji. It connection with the ancient kokubunji, if any is unknown.

A large number of roof tiles from various eras, and shards of Nara Sancai pottery have been excavated from the site. The site is now an archaeological park, where visitors can see the foundations of the Nara-period buildings. Nearby is the Ryōgūzan Kofun, which has a separate National Historic Site designation. The site of the Bizen kokufu is located about 6.5 kilometers southwest.

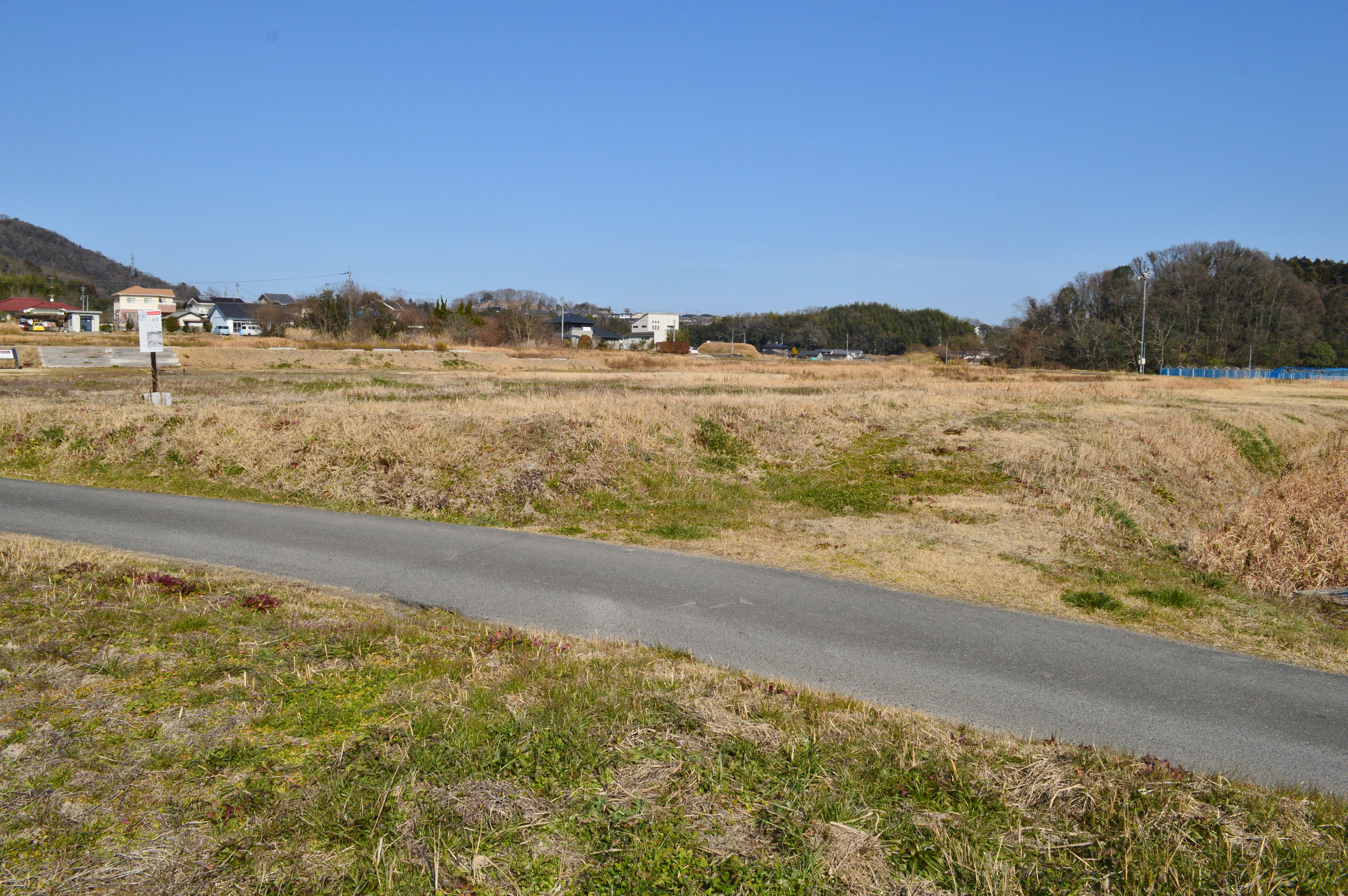
Site of Kondo

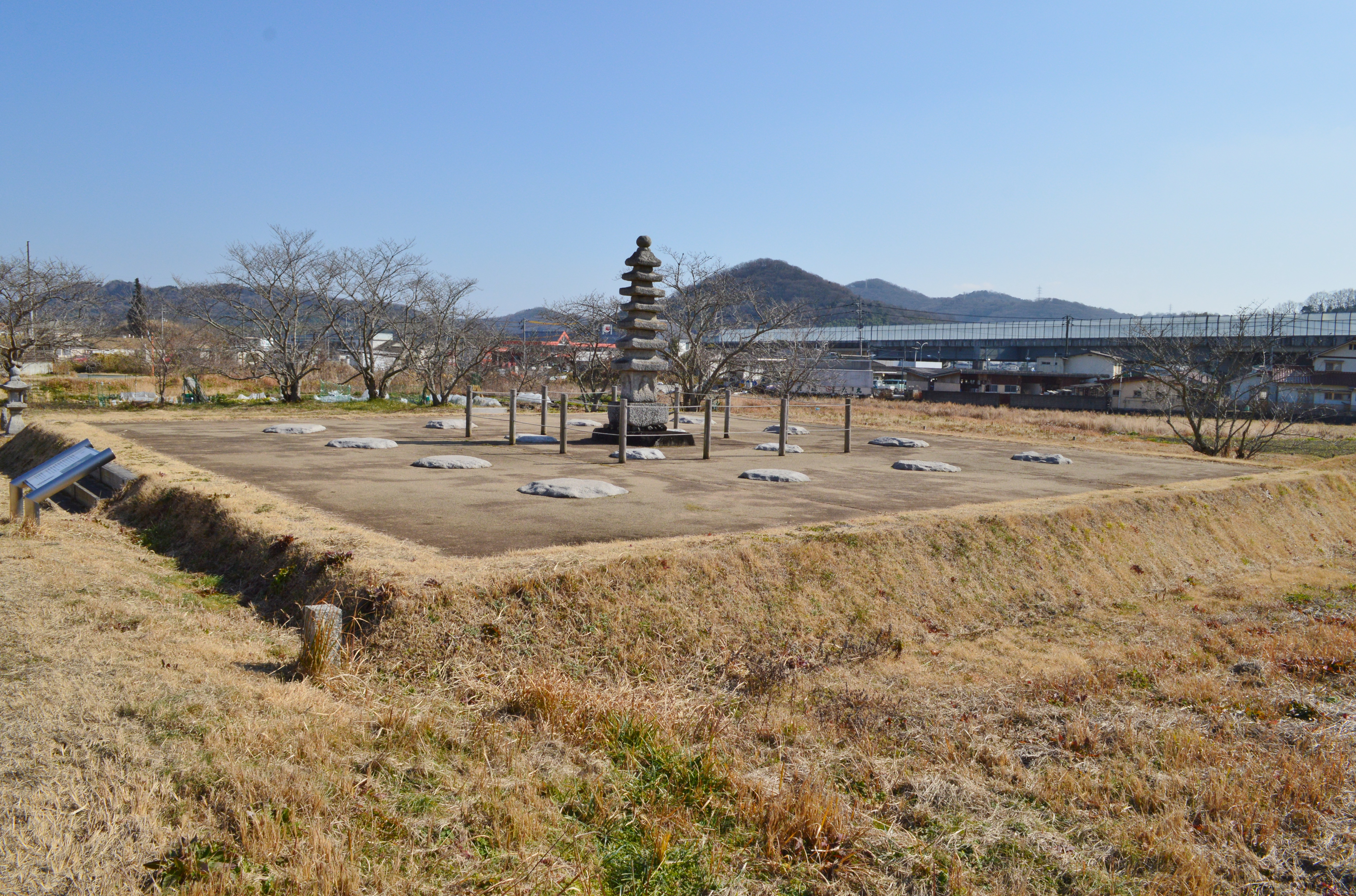
Site of the Pagoda

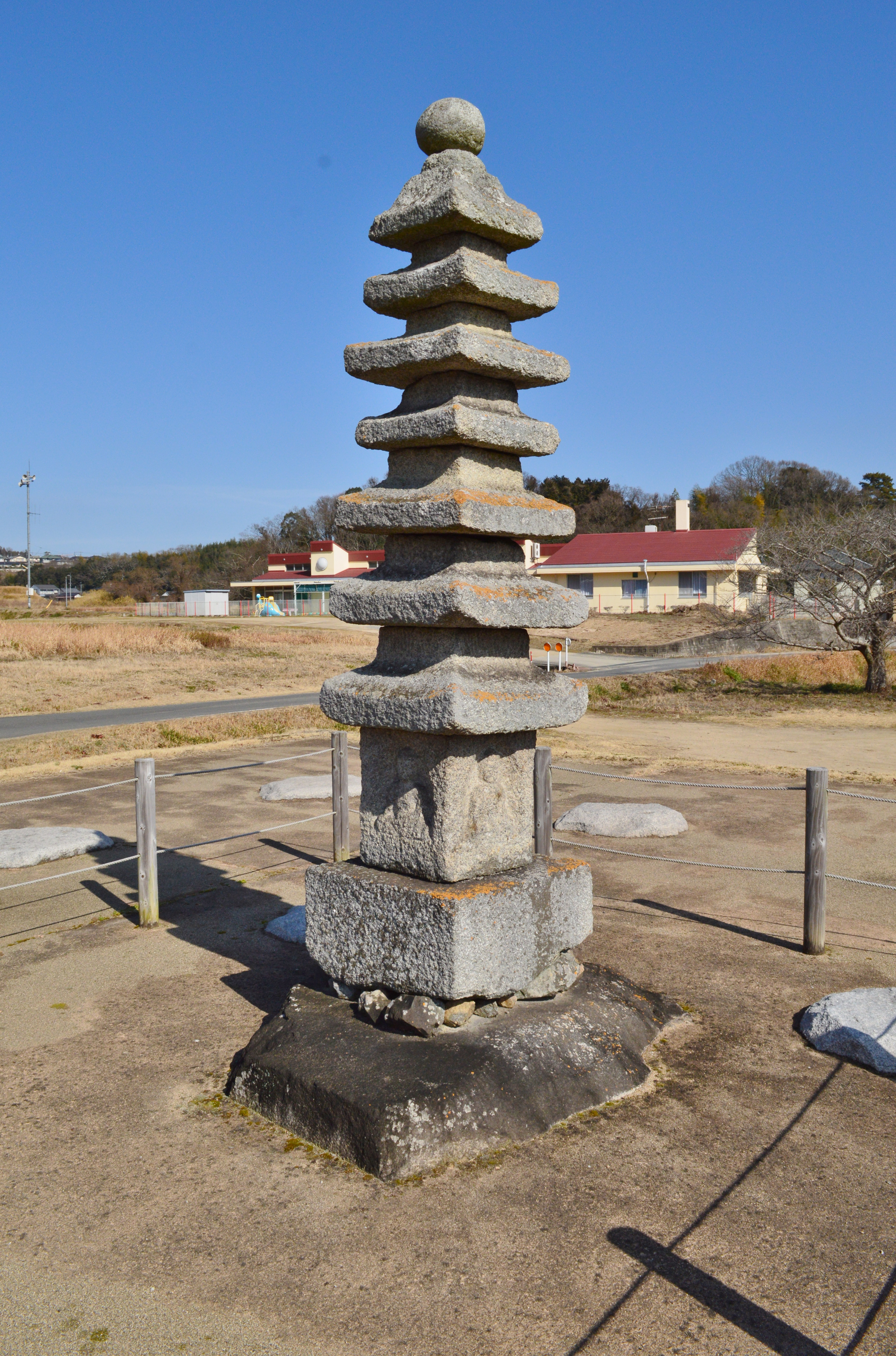
Kamakura period stone pagoda

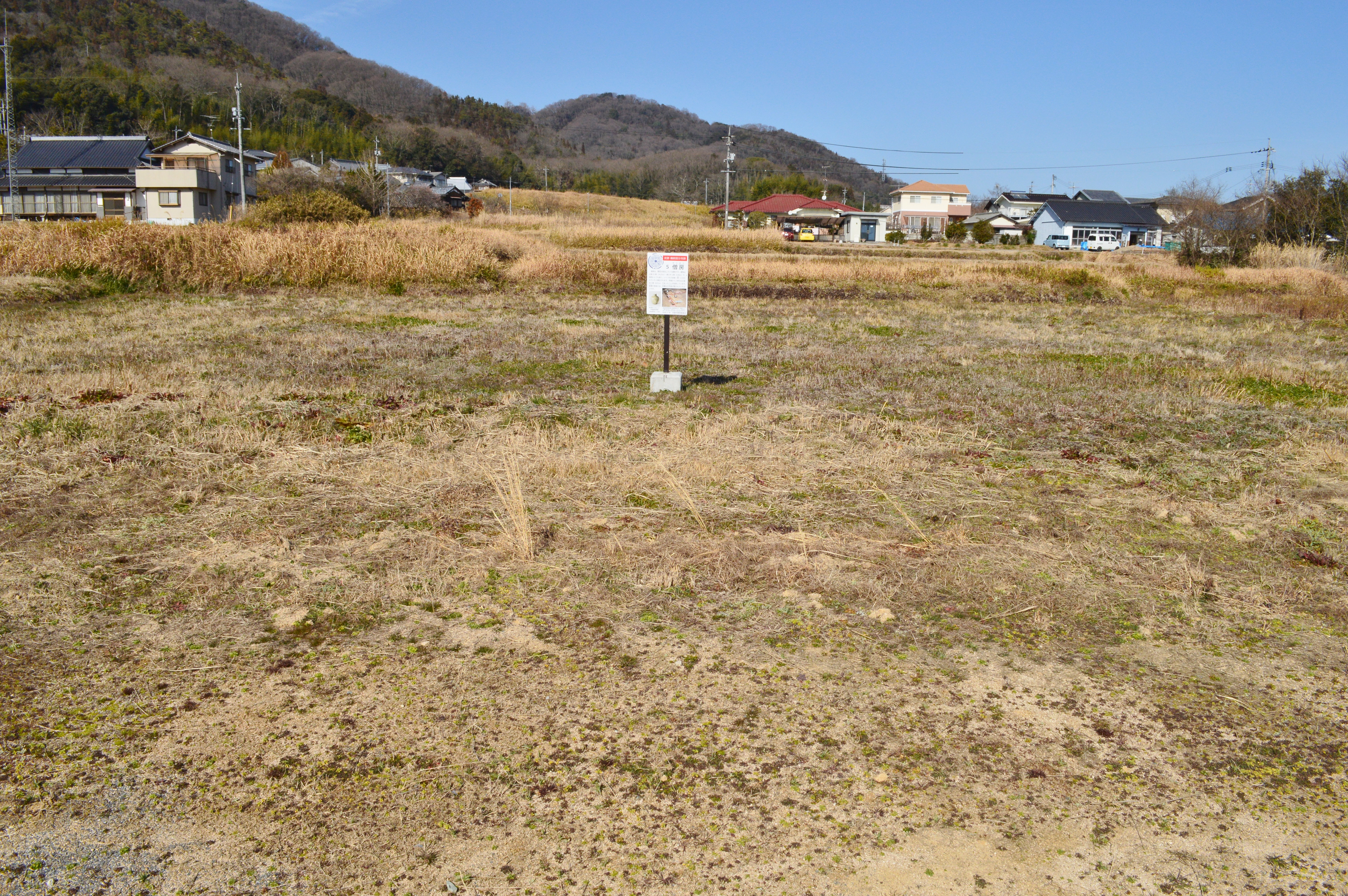
Site of the monk's quarters

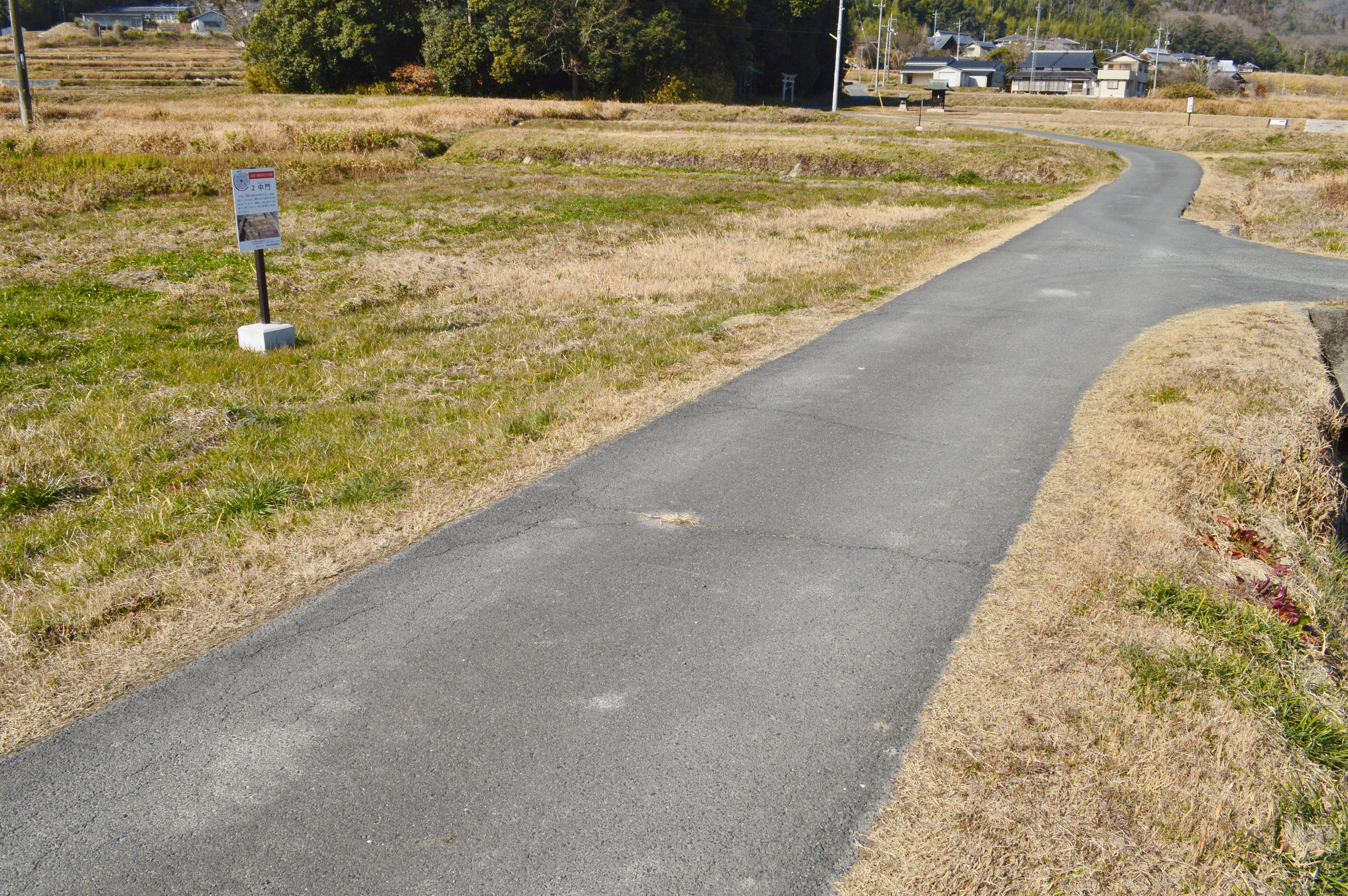
Site of the Middle Gate

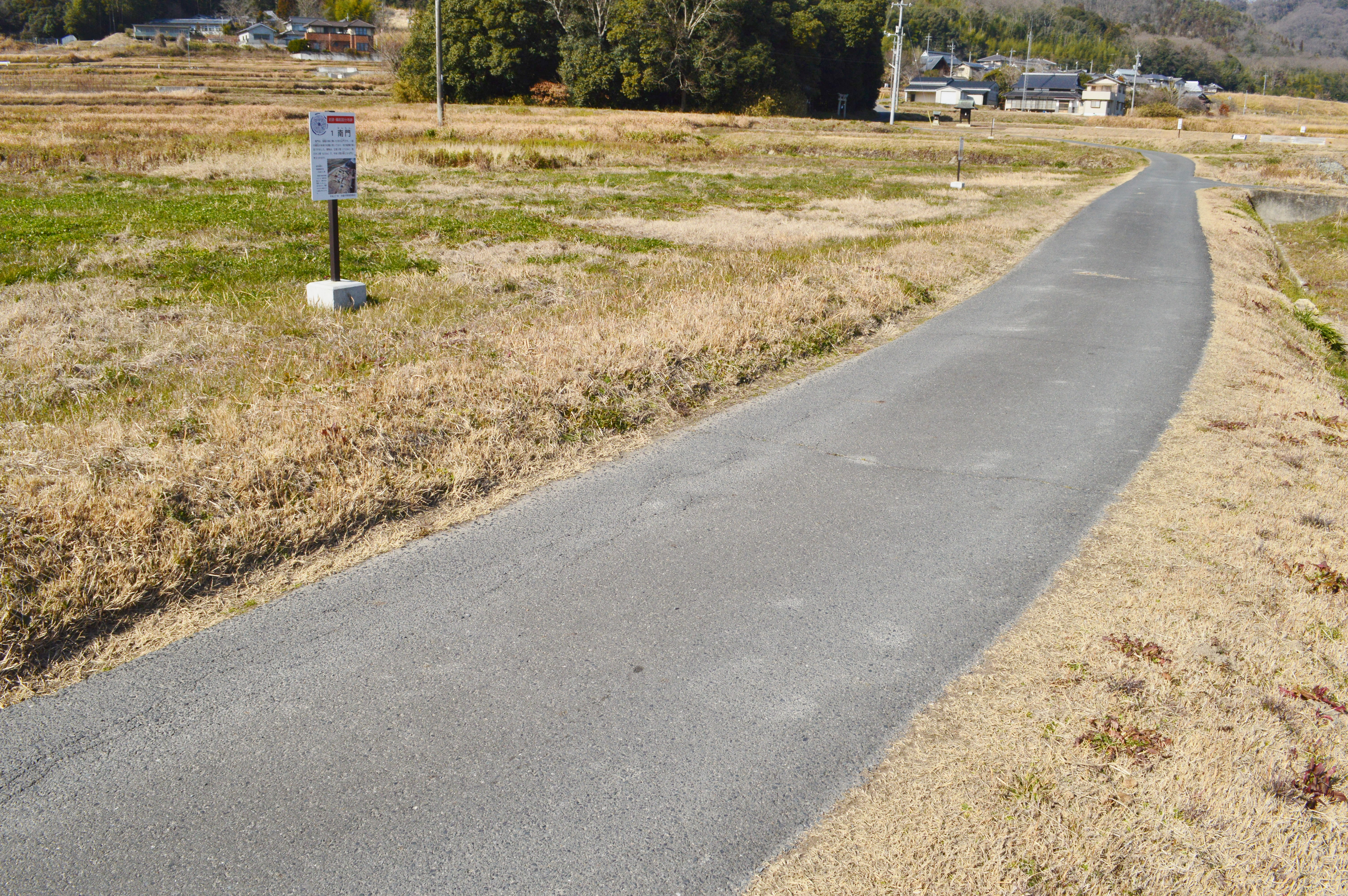
Site of the South Gate

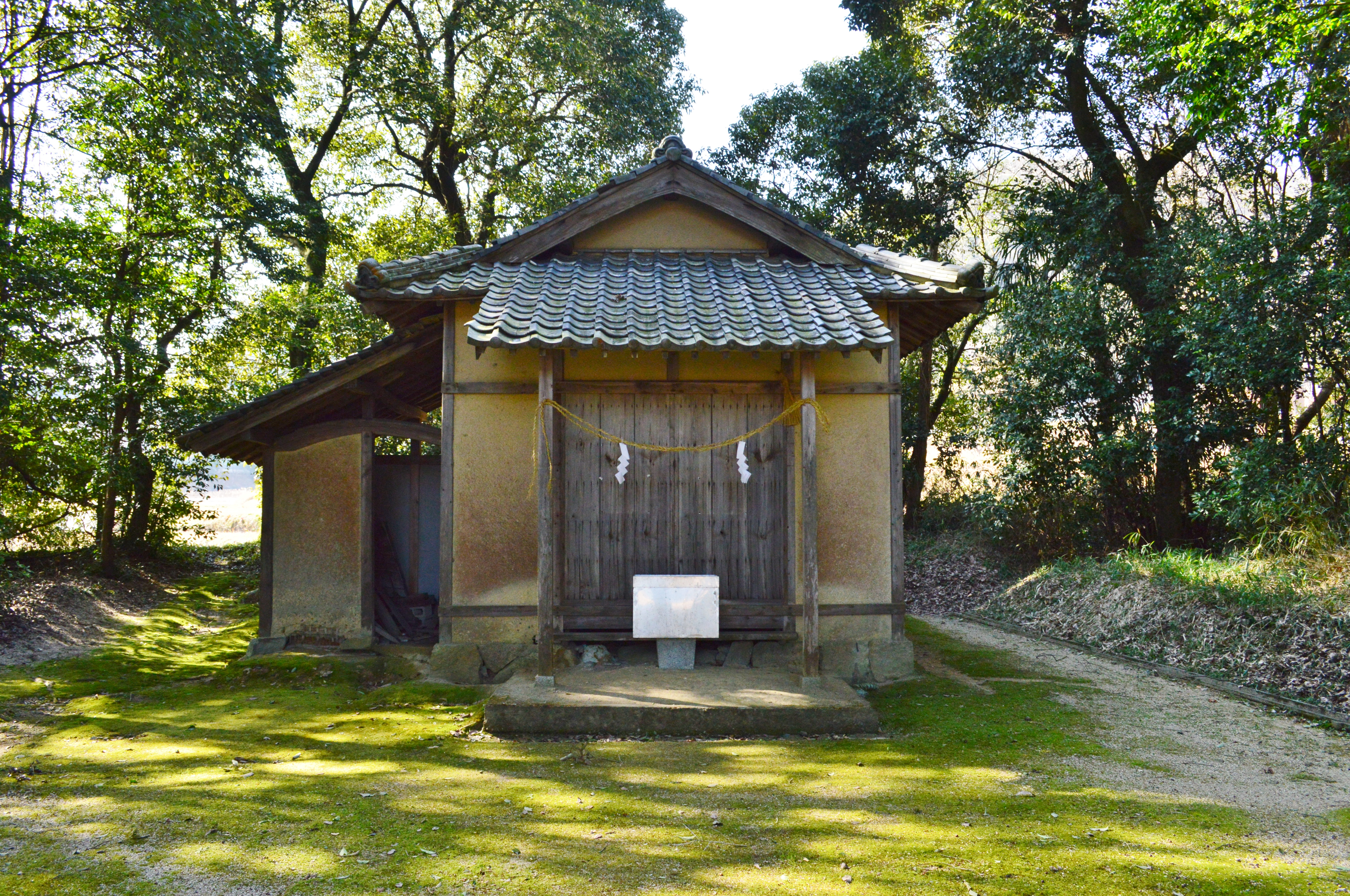
Kokubunji Hachiman-gu

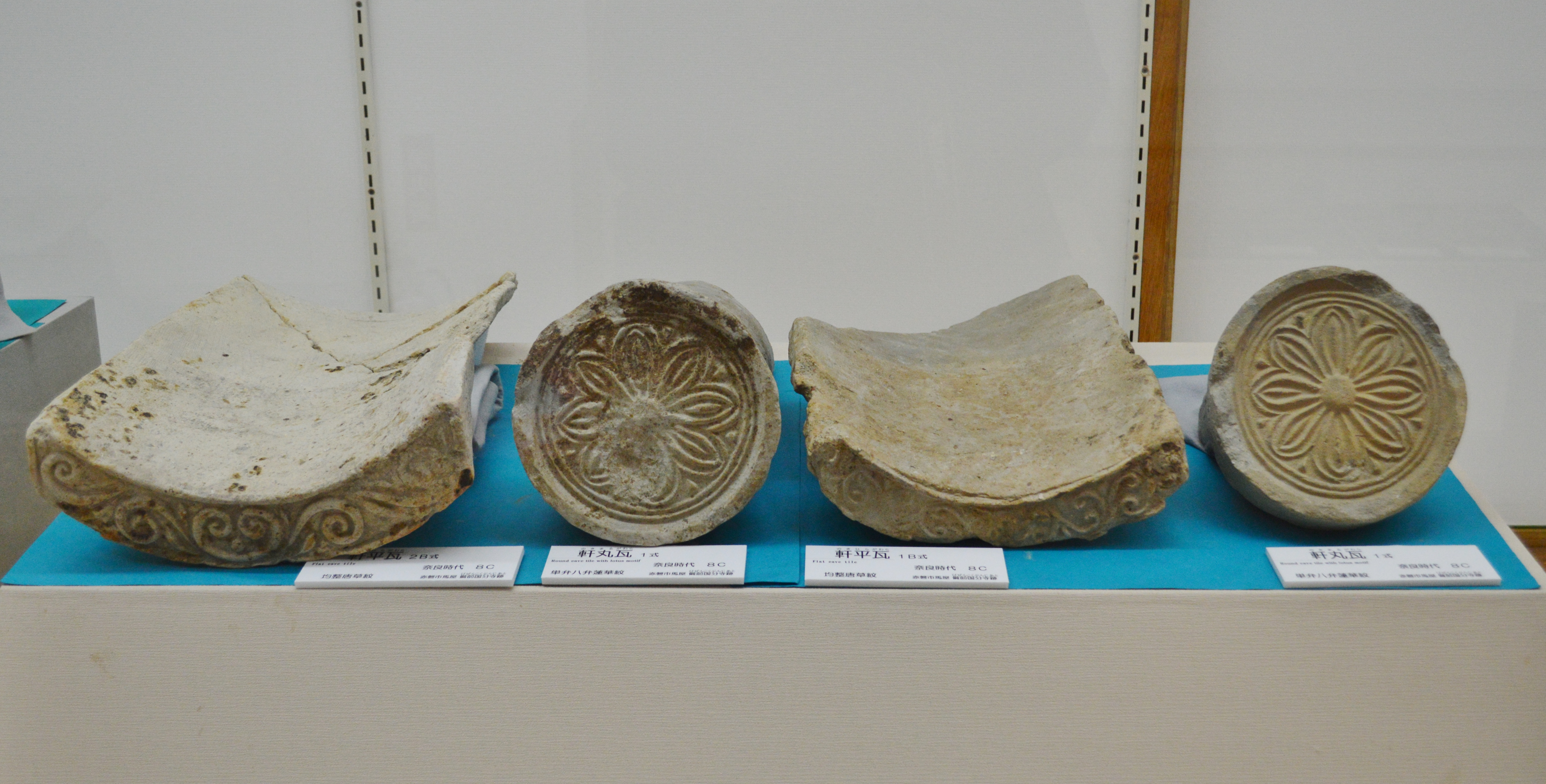
Excavated roof tiles

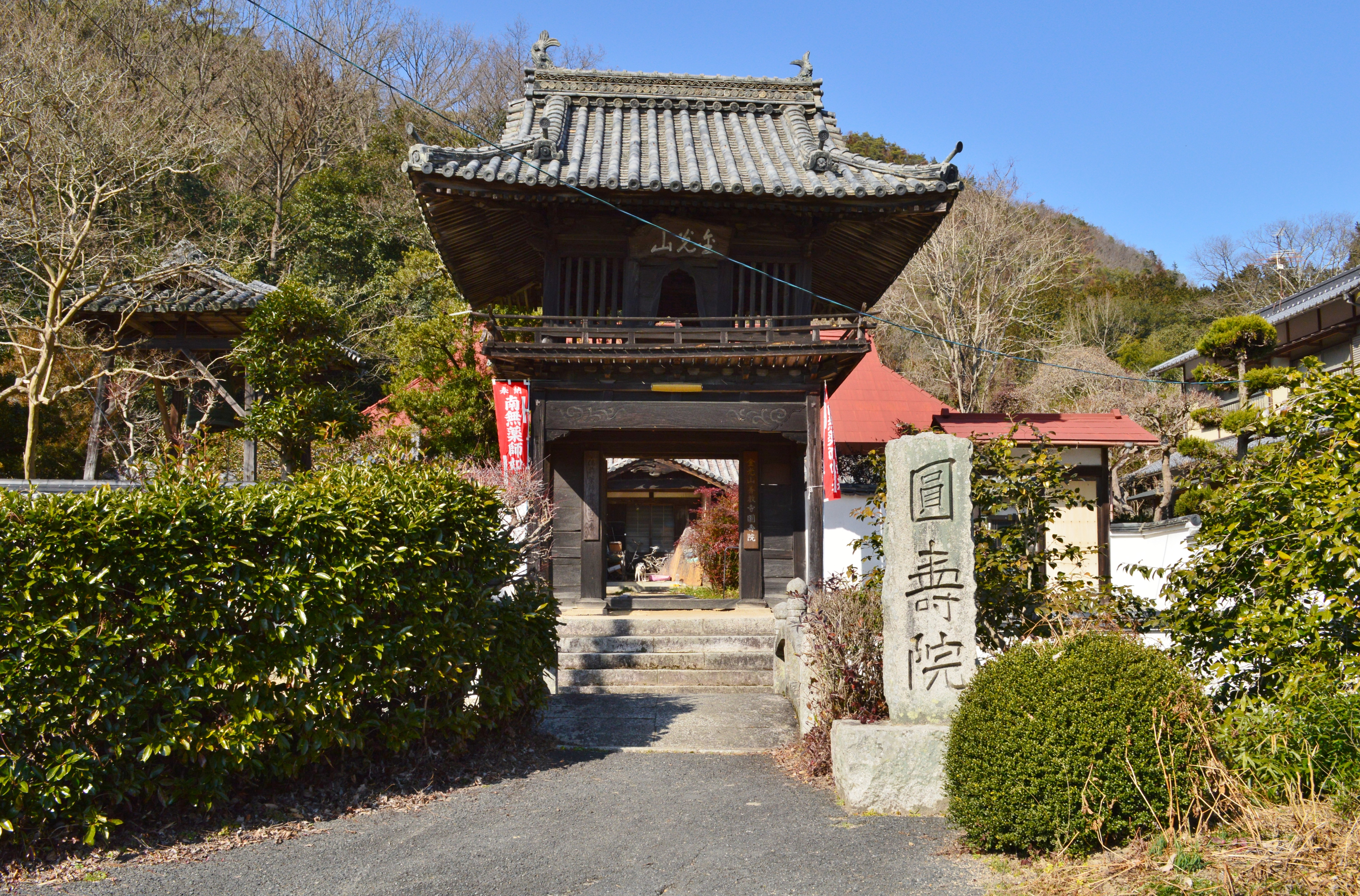
Enju-in

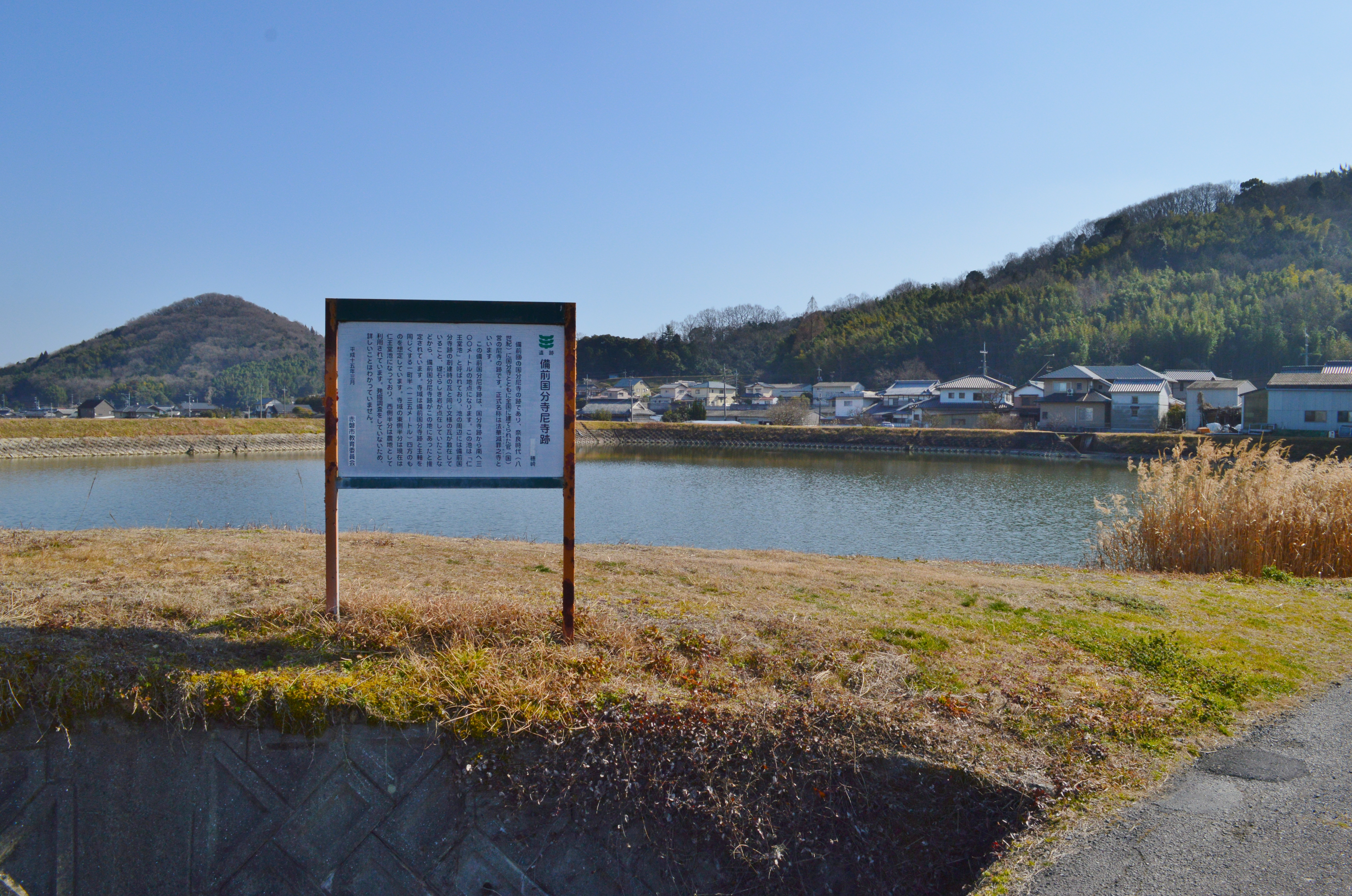
Bizen Kokubun-niji site

== Bizen Kokubun-niji ==
The Bizen Kokubun Nunnery ruins (which are not part of the National Historic Site) are located about 300 meters south of the Bizen Kokubun-ji ruins across the ancient San'yōdō highway (34°44′6.60″N 134°0′0.30″E). The estimated temple area is 1.5 chō square (135 meters square). The eastern half is now a reservoir and the western half is farmland. No full-scale excavation has been carried out, so the details are unclear, but roof tiles similar to those at Kokubun-ji have been excavated from the estimated temple area, and rocks thought to have been foundation stones were once scattered around.

== See also ==
- List of Historic Sites of Japan (Okayama)
- provincial temple
