= Seto, Okayama =

Dissolved municipality in Okayama prefecture, Japan

Seto (瀬戸町, Seto-chō) was a town located in Akaiwa District, Okayama Prefecture, Japan.

== Population ==
As of 2003, the town had an estimated population of 14,794 and a density of 354.09 persons per km^{2}. The total area was 41.78 km^{2}.

== History ==
On January 22, 2007, Seto, along with town of Takebe (from Mitsu District), was merged into the expanded city of Okayama.
