= Yoshii, Okayama (Akaiwa) =

Dissolved municipality in Okayama prefecture, Japan

Yoshii (吉井町, Yoshii-chō) was a town located in Akaiwa District, Okayama Prefecture, Japan.

As of 2006, the town had an estimated population of 5,386 and a density of 62.58 persons per km^{2} and 1,963 families. The total area was 86.07 km^{2}.

On March 7, 2005, Yoshii, along with the towns of Akasaka, Kumayama and San'yō (all from Akaiwa District), were merged to create the city of Akaiwa.

Yoshii's main farm products were rice, cucumbers, grapes and garlic chives. Yoshii's total agricultural production was valued 690 million yen in 2001.

There is a junior high school and two elementary schools in Yoshii.

- Yoshii Junior High
- Jōnan Elementary
- Jimbi Elementary

The Osuwa festival is held every August in Yoshii. Many people come to this festival from different places to enjoy traditional Japanese dancing.
