= Akaiwa District, Okayama =

Former district in Okayama prefecture, Japan

Akaiwa (赤磐郡, Akaiwa-gun) was a district located in Okayama Prefecture, Japan. The district seat (under district government) was village of Monori (central Seto Town in the city of Okayama).

As of 2004, the district had an estimated population of 14,945. The total area was 41.78 km^{2}.

The district had only one town:

- Seto

== History ==
- April 1, 1900 - Founded by the merger of Akasaka and Iwanashi Districts. (26 towns)
- March 7, 2005 - The towns of Akasaka, Kumayama, San'yō and Yoshii were merged to create the city of Akaiwa. (1 town)
- January 22, 2007 - The town of Seto, along with town of Takebe (from Mitsu District), was merged into the expanded city of Okayama. Akaiwa District was dissolved as a result of this merger.
