= San'yō, Okayama =

Dissolved municipality in Okayama prefecture, Japan

San'yō (山陽町, San'yō-chō) was a town located in Akaiwa District, Okayama Prefecture, Japan.

== Population ==
As of 2003, the town had an estimated population of 24,939 and a density of 719.95 persons per km^{2}. The total area was 34.64 km^{2}.

== History ==
On March 7, 2005, San'yō, along with the towns of Akasaka, Kumayama and Yoshii (all from Akaiwa District), were merged to create the city of Akaiwa.
