= Akaiwa =

Akaiwa 赤磐市
- City
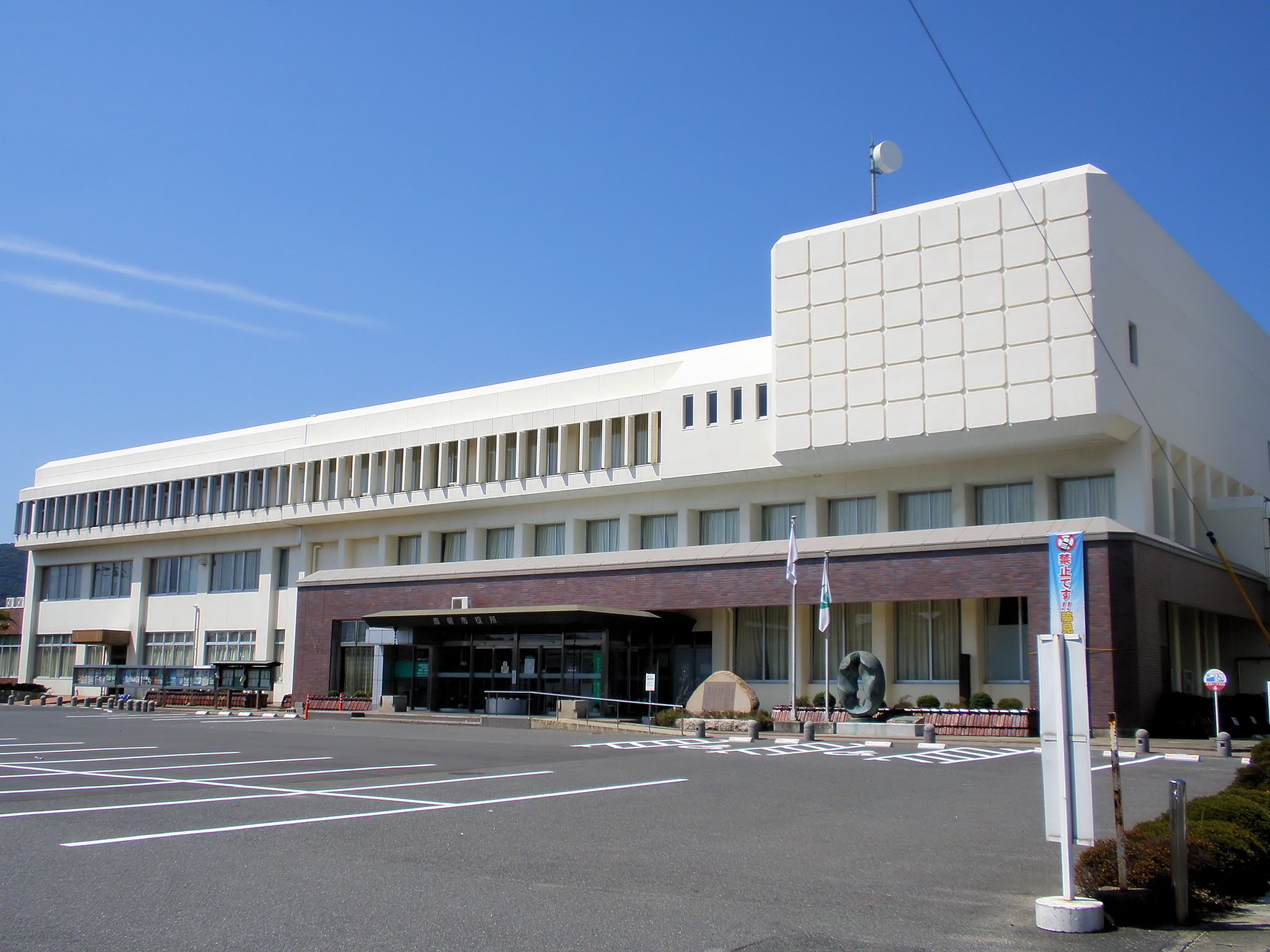
- Akaiwa City Hall

- Flag Seal
- Interactive map of Akaiwa
- Location in Japan
- Coordinates: 34°45′19″N 134°01′08″E
- Country: Japan
- Region: Chūgoku (San'yō)
- Prefecture: Okayama

Government
  - Mayor: Toshio Inoue (since April 2009)

Area
  - Total: 209.36 km^{2} (80.83 sq mi)

Population (March 1, 2023)
  - Total: 43,359
  - Density: 207.10/km^{2} (536.39/sq mi)
- Time zone: UTC+09:00 (JST)
- City hall address: 344 Shimoichi, Akaiwa-shi, Okayama-ken 709-0898
- Website: Official website
- Symbols
- Flower: Peach・Cherry blossom
- Tree: Pinus

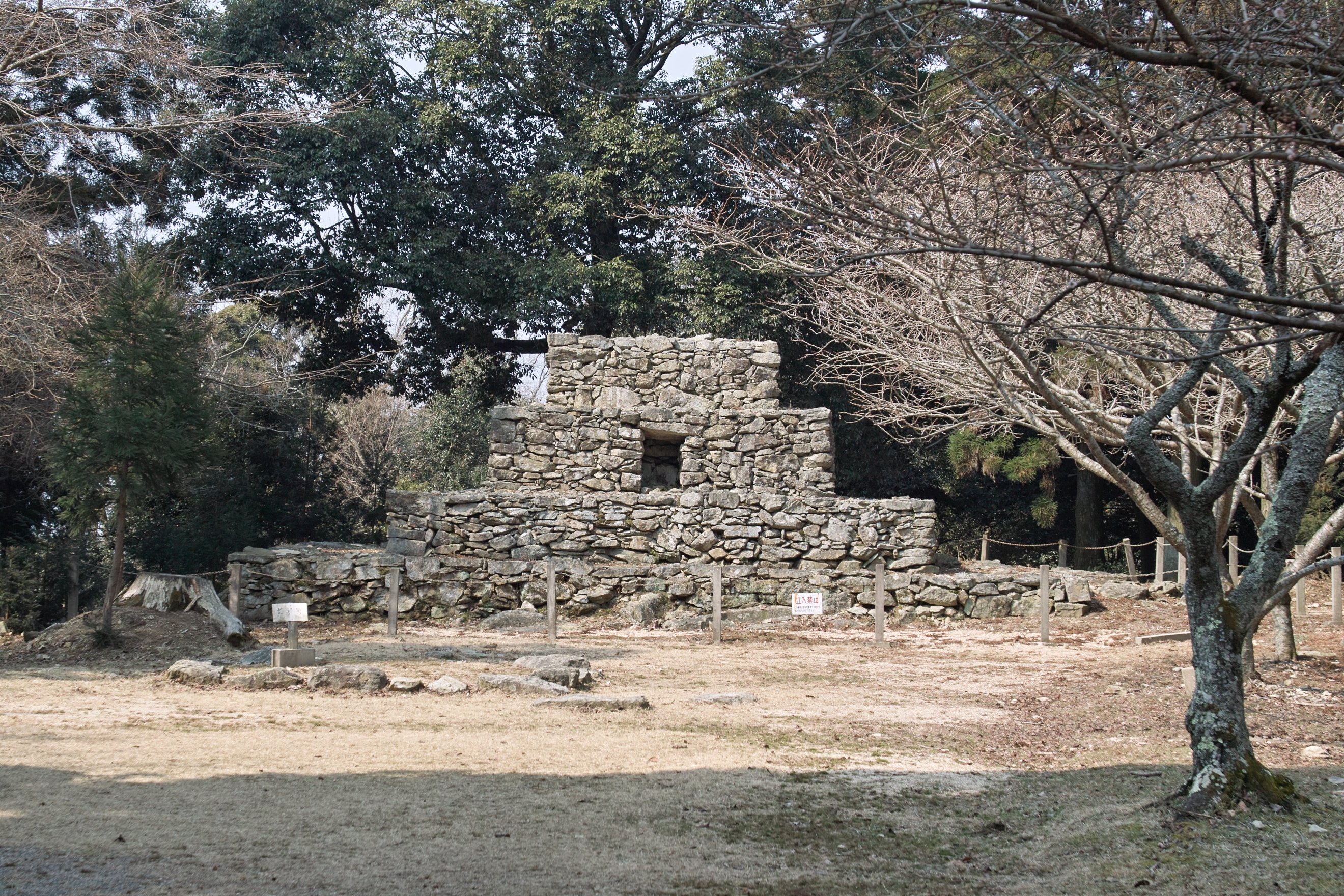
Kumayama ruins

Akaiwa (赤磐市, Akaiwa-shi; Japanese pronunciation: [ä̀.kä́ì.β̞ä̀, -kä́í.β̞ä́.ɕì]) is a city located in Okayama Prefecture, Japan. As of 1 March 2023, the city had an estimated population of 43,359 in 18809 households and a population density of 210 persons per km^{2}. The total area of the city is 209.36 square kilometres (80.83 sq mi).

== Geography ==
Akaiwa is located in east-central Okayama Prefecture. The Yoshii River, one of the three major rivers in the prefecture, flows through the northeastern part of the city. Although it is located in the northeastern part of the Okayama Plain, most of the city area is hills and forests.

=== Adjoining municipalities ===
Okayama Prefecture

- Bizen
- Kumenan
- Misaki
- Okayama
- Wake

=== Climate ===
Akaiwa has a humid subtropical climate (Köppen climate classification Cfa) with very warm summers and cool winters. The average annual temperature in Akaiwa is 14.5 °C. The average annual rainfall is 1306 mm with September as the wettest month. The temperatures are highest on average in August, at around 26.3 °C, and lowest in January, at around 3.2 °C.

== Demographics ==
Per Japanese census data, the population of Akaiwa is as follows.

Historical population
Year	Pop.	±%
1960	31,234	—
1970	26,911	−13.8%
1980	37,007	+37.5%
1990	41,016	+10.8%
2000	43,813	+6.8%
2010	43,476	−0.8%

== History ==
The Akaiwa area is part of ancient Bizen Province and was near the center of political power, as it was the location of the Bizen Kokubun-ji. During the Edo Period, it was part of the holdings of Okayama Domain. Following the Meiji restoration, the area was organized into villages within Akasaka and Iwanashi Districts of Okayama Prefecture with the creation of the modern municipalities system on April 1, 1889. The two districts were merged to form Akaiwa District, Okayama in 1900.

The city of Akaiwa was established on March 7, 2005, from the merger of the towns of Akasaka, Kumayama, San'yō and Yoshii (all from Akaiwa District).

== Government ==
Akaiwa has a mayor-council form of government with a directly elected mayor and a unicameral city council of 18 members. Akaiwa contributes one member to the Okayama Prefectural Assembly. In terms of national politics, the city is part of the Okayama 1st district of the lower house of the Diet of Japan.

== Economy ==
Then economy of Akaiwa is primarily based on agriculture and food processing. Horticulture, especially then cultivation of peaches and grapes, and production of agricultural machinery are important to the local economy.

Akaiwa is one of three remaining places in Japan that produces the bamboo stalk for fude ink brushes. The harvested bamboo stalks are spread in the dry riverbed of the Yoshii River during the winter to dry under the sun. The stalks are then boiled in the town to remove impurities.

== Education ==
Akaiwa has 13 public elementary schools and five public junior high schools operated by the city government, and one public high school operated by the Okayama Prefectural Board of Education. There is also one private combined middle/high school.

== Transportation ==
=== Railway ===
JR West (JR West) - San'yō Main Line

- Kumayama

=== Highways ===
- San'yō Expressway
- National Route 374
- National Route 484

== Local attractions ==
- Bizen Kokubun-ji ruins, National Historic Site
- Kumayama ruins, National Historic Site
- Ryōgūsan Kofun, National Historic Site
