= Osakabe Station =

Railway station in Niimi, Okayama Prefecture, Japan

Osakabe Station 刑部駅
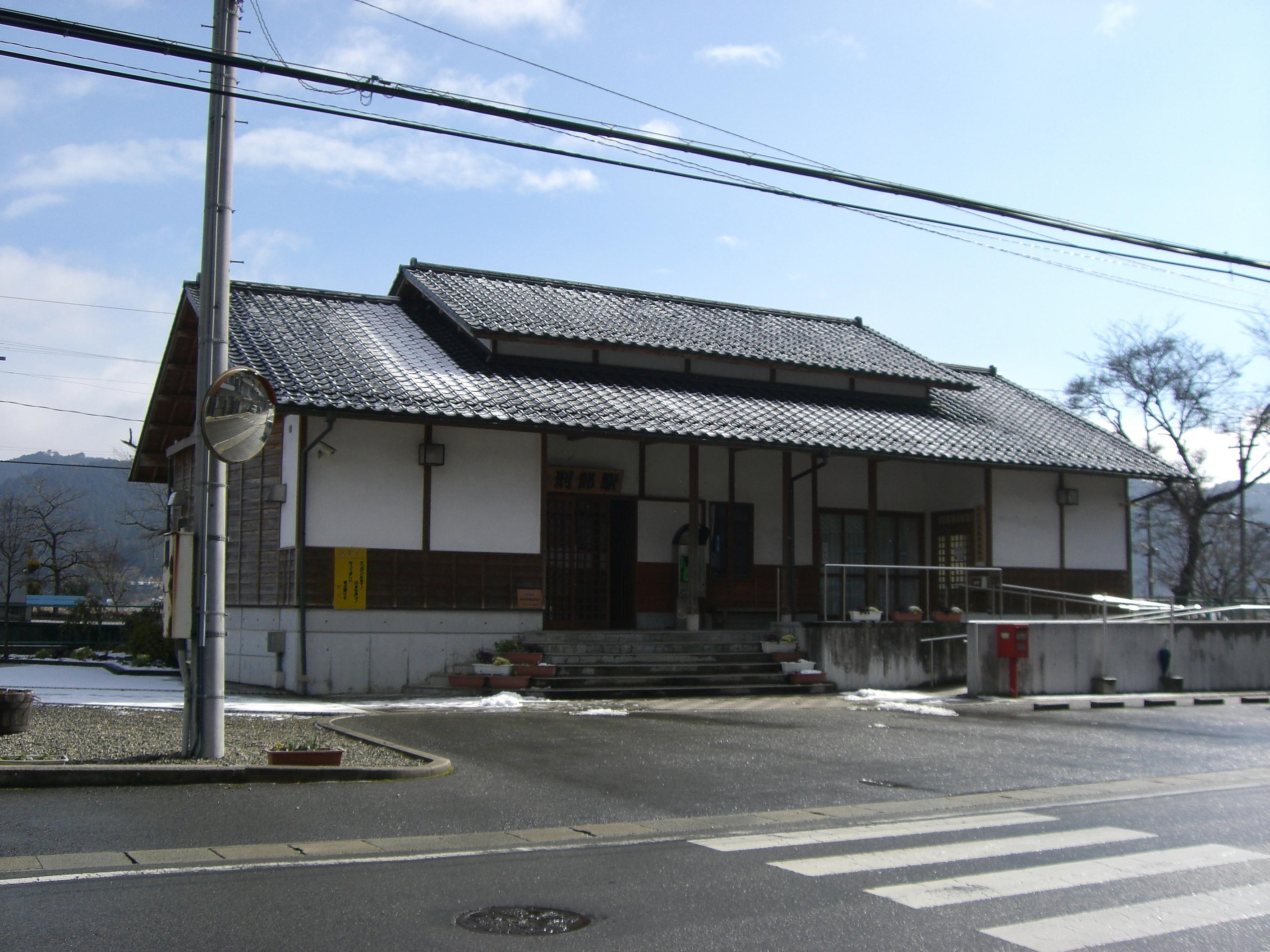
- Osakabe Station in January 2007

General information
- Location: 2506-2 Osa-Osakabe, Niimi-shi, Okayama-ken 719-3503; Japan
- Coordinates: 35°4′34.28″N 133°33′56.77″E
- Operator: JR West
- Line: K Kishin Line
- Distance: 141.2 km (87.7 miles) from Himeji
- Platforms: 2 side platforms
- Tracks: 1

Other information
- Status: Unstaffed
- Website: Official website

History
- Opened: 11 December 1920

Passengers
- 2019: 54 daily
Location
- Location within Okayama Prefecture Location within Japan

Osakabe Station (刑部駅, Osakabe-eki) is a passenger railway station located in the city of Niimi, Okayama Prefecture, Japan. It is operated by the West Japan Railway Company (JR West).

== Lines ==
Osakabe Station is served by the Kishin Line, and is located 141.2 kilometers from the terminus of the line at Himeji.

== Station layout ==
The station consists of two unnumbered opposed ground-level side platforms. The station building is on the side of the Tsuyama-bound platform, and both platforms are connected by a level crossing. The wooden station building houses a retail store and has a waiting room. There is a square in front of the station, and a streetlight in the shape of a paraglider is installed.

=== Platforms ===
station side	■ K Kishin Line	for Chūgoku-Katsuyama, Tsuyama and Sayo
opp side	■ K Kishin Line	for Niimi

== Adjacent stations ==
«	Service	»
Kishin Line
Tomihara	Rapid	Tajibe
Tomihara	Local	Tajibe

== History ==
Osakabe Station opened on December 11, 1930. With the privatization of the Japan National Railways (JNR) on April 1, 1987, the station came under the aegis of the West Japan Railway Company.

== Passenger statistics ==
In fiscal 2019, the station was used by an average of 54 passengers daily.

== Surrounding area ==
- Niimi City Colonel Branch Office
- Niimi Municipal Osa Junior High School
- Niimi Municipal Gyobu Elementary School

== See also ==
- List of railway stations in Japan
