= Mimasaka-Emi Station =

Railway station in Mimasaka, Okayama Prefecture, Japan

Mimasaka-Emi Station 美作江見駅
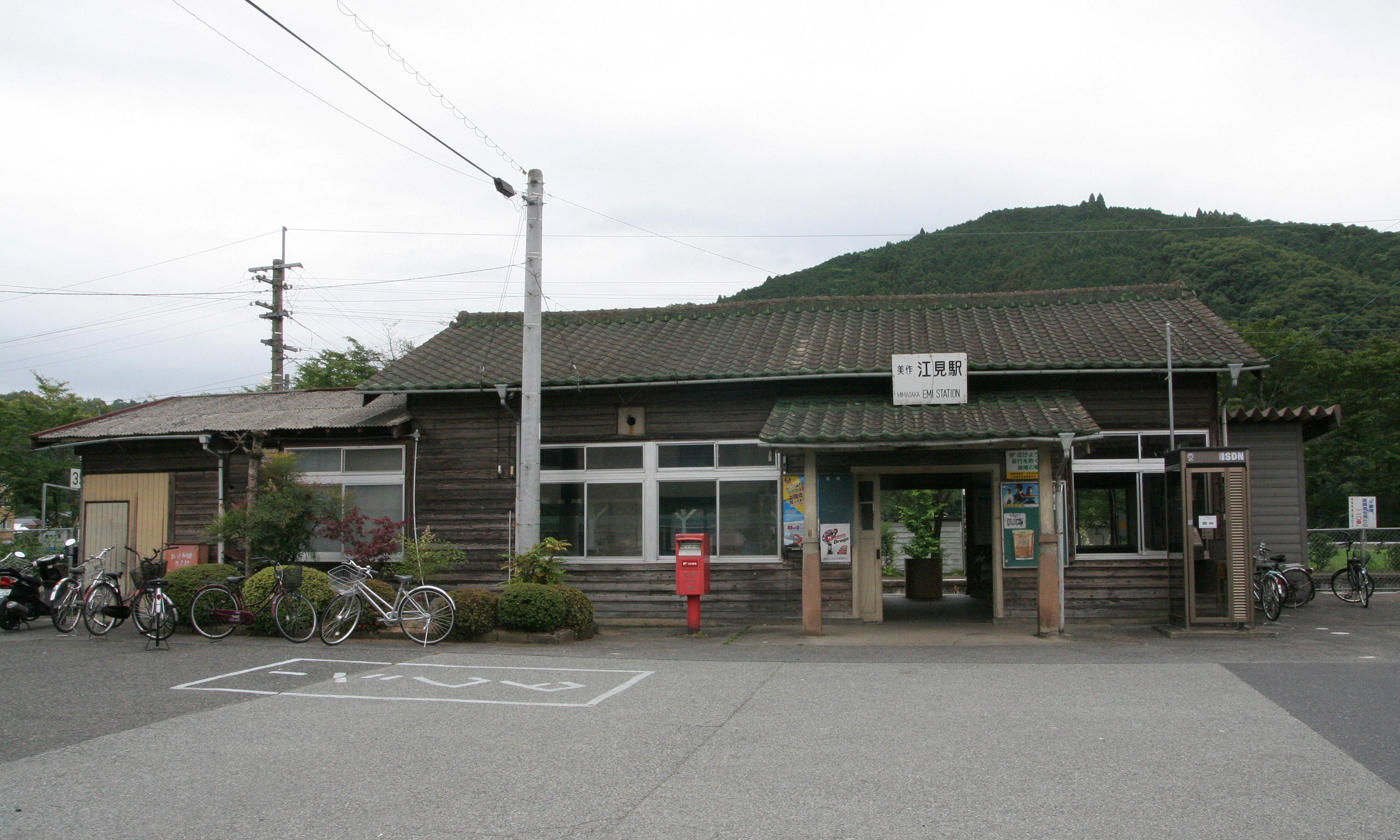
- Mimasaka-Emi Station, June 2008

General information
- Location: 92-2 Kawakita, Mimasaka-shi, Okayama-ken 709-4236; Japan
- Coordinates: 35°0′48.25″N 134°13′11.11″E
- Owner: West Japan Railway Company
- Operator: West Japan Railway Company
- Line: Kishin Line
- Distance: 63.0 km (39.1 miles) from Himeji
- Platforms: 2 side platforms
- Connections: Bus stop

Other information
- Status: Staffed
- Website: Official website

History
- Opened: 28 November 1934; 91 years ago

Passengers
- FY2019: 51 daily

Services
Kishin Line
Mimasaka-Doi	Rapid	Narahara
Mimasaka-Doi	Local	Narahara
Location
- Location within Okayama Prefecture Location within Japan

Mimasaka-Emi Station (美作江見駅, Mimasaka-Emi-eki) is a passenger railway station located in the city of Mimasaka, Okayama Prefecture, Japan, operated by West Japan Railway Company (JR West).

== Lines ==
Mimasaka-Emi Station is served by the Kishin Line, and is located 63.0 kilometers from the southern terminus of the line at Himeji.

== Station layout ==
The station consists of two ground-level island platforms connected by a level crossing. The wooden station building is on the side of Platform 2. The station is attended.

=== Platforms ===
1	■ Kishin Line	for Sayo
2	■ Kishin Line	for Tsuyama, Niimi

== History ==
Mimasaka-Emi Station opened on November 28, 1934. With the privatization of the Japan National Railways (JNR) on April 1, 1987, the station came under the aegis of the West Japan Railway Company. A new station building was completed in February 2021.

== Passenger statistics ==
In fiscal 2019, the station was used by an average of 51 passengers daily.

== Surrounding area ==
- Mimasaka City Sakuto General Branch
- Mimasaka Municipal Sakuhigashi Junior High School
- Chugoku Expressway - Sakuto Bus Stop

== See also ==
- List of railway stations in Japan
