= Yobe Station =

Railway station in Himeji, Hyōgo Prefecture, Japan

Yobe Station 余部駅
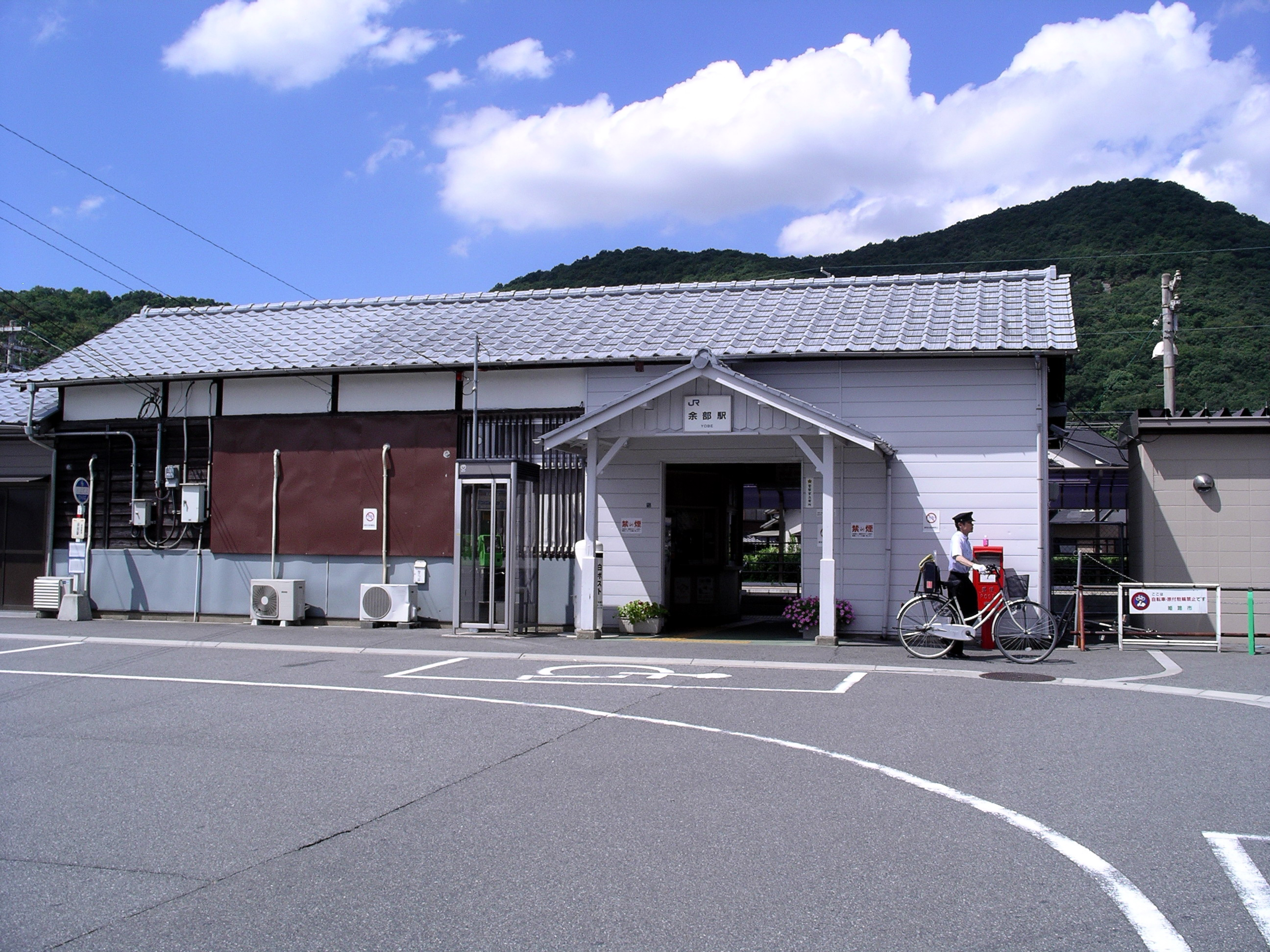
- Yobe Station in August 2012

General information
- Location: 1-25-1 Aoyamakita, Himeji-shi, Hyōgo-ken 669-6671; Japan
- Coordinates: 34.8562°N 134.6421°E
- Owner: West Japan Railway Company
- Operator: West Japan Railway Company
- Line: Kishin Line
- Distance: 6.1 km (3.8 miles) from Himeji
- Platforms: 2 side platforms
- Connections: Bus stop

Other information
- Status: Unstaffed
- Website: Official website

History
- Opened: 1 September 1930; 95 years ago

Passengers
- FY2019: 2228 daily

Services
Preceding station	JR West	Following station
Ōichi towards Niimi	Kishin Line Local	Harima-Takaoka towards Himeji
Location
- Location within Hyōgo Prefecture Location within Japan

Yobe Station (余部駅, Yobe-eki) is a passenger railway station located in the city of Himeji, Hyōgo Prefecture, Japan, operated by West Japan Railway Company (JR West).

== Lines ==
Yobe Station is served by the Kishin Line, and is located 6.1 kilometers from the terminus of the line at Himeji.

== Station layout ==
The station consists of two ground-level opposed side platforms connected by a level crossing. The station is unattended.

=== Platforms ===
1	■ Kishin Line	for Sayo
2	■ Kishin Line	for Himeji

== History ==
Yobe Station opened on September 1, 1930. With the privatization of the Japan National Railways (JNR) on April 1, 1987, the station came under the aegis of the West Japan Railway Company.

== Passenger statistics ==
In fiscal 2019, the station was used by an average of 2228 passengers daily.

== Surrounding area ==
- Hyogo Prefectural University Himeji Shosha Campus
- Hyogo Prefectural Himeji Shikisai High School
- Himeji Railway Department

== See also ==
- List of railway stations in Japan
