= Nishi-Kurisu Station =

Railway station in Tatsuno, Hyōgo Prefecture, Japan

Nishi-Kurisu Station 西栗栖駅
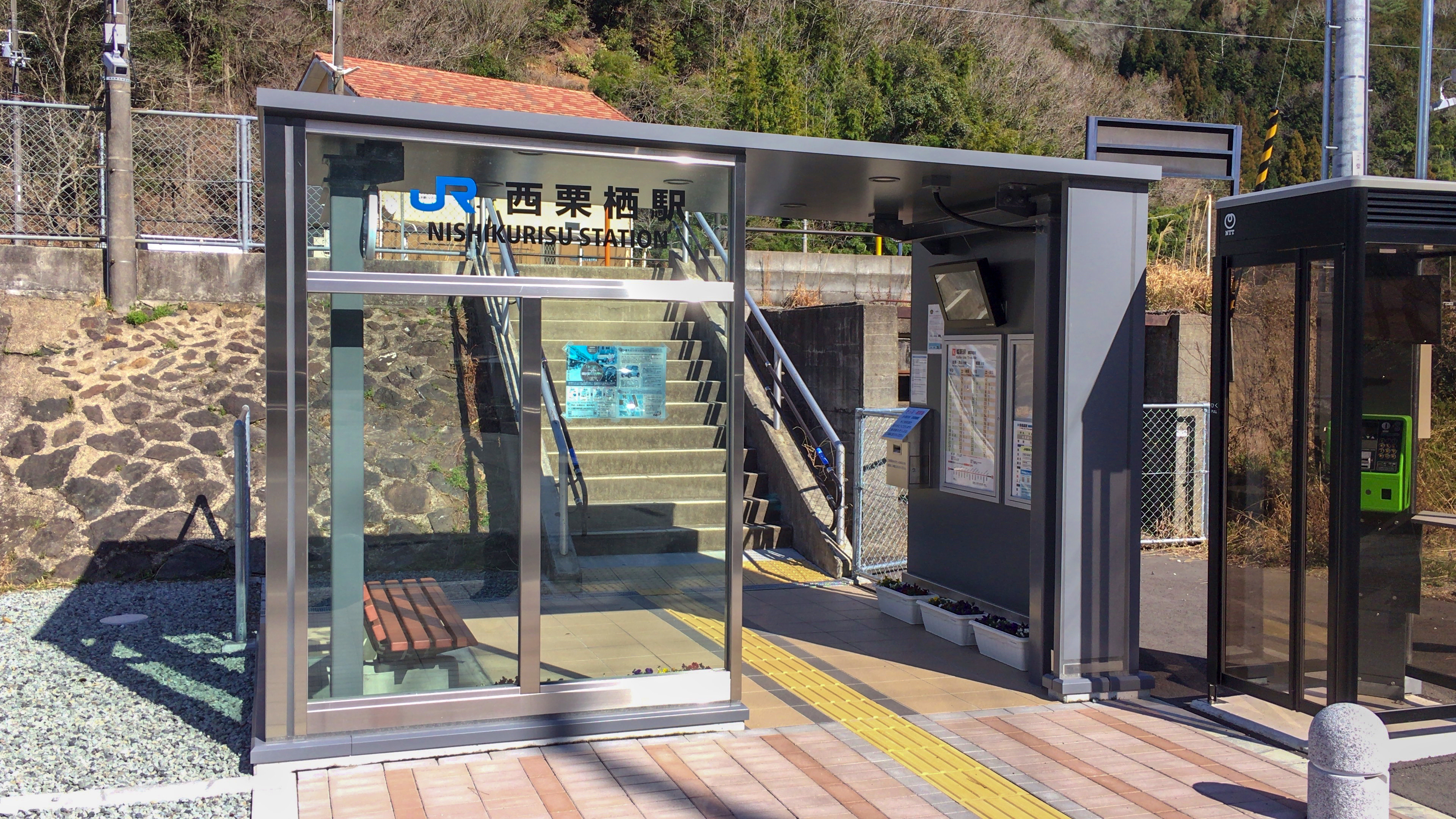
- Nishi-Kurisu Station, March 2021

General information
- Location: Shingu-chō Kajiya, Tatsuno-shi, Hyōgo-ken 679-5154; Japan
- Coordinates: 34.9522°N 134.4709°E
- Owner: West Japan Railway Company
- Operator: West Japan Railway Company
- Line: Kishin Line
- Distance: 31.2 km (19.4 miles) from Himeji
- Platforms: 2 side platforms
- Connections: Bus stop

Other information
- Status: Unstaffed
- Website: Official website

History
- Opened: 24 March 1934; 92 years ago

Passengers
- FY2019: 85 daily

Services
Preceding station	JR West	Following station
Mikazuki towards Niimi	Kishin Line Local	Sembon towards Himeji
Location
- Location within Hyōgo Prefecture Location within Japan

Nishi-Kurisu Station (西栗栖駅, Nishi-Kurisu-eki) is a passenger railway station located in the city of Tatsuno, Hyōgo Prefecture, Japan, operated by West Japan Railway Company (JR West).

== Lines ==
Nishi-Kurisu Station is served by the Kishin Line, and is located 31.2 kilometers from the terminus of the line at Himeji.

== Station layout ==
The station consists of two opposed ground-level side platforms connected to the station building by a level crossing. The station is unattended.

=== Platforms ===
1	■ Kishin Line	for Sayo
2	■ Kishin Line	for Himeji

== History ==
Nishi-Kurisu Station opened on March 24, 1934. With the privatization of the Japan National Railways (JNR) on April 1, 1987, the station came under the aegis of the West Japan Railway Company.

== Passenger statistics ==
In fiscal 2019, the station was used by an average of 85 passengers daily.

== Surrounding area ==
- Japan National Route 179

== See also ==
- List of railway stations in Japan
