= Nishi-Katsumada Station =

Railway station in Shōō, Okayama Prefecture, Japan

Nishi-Katsumada 西勝間田
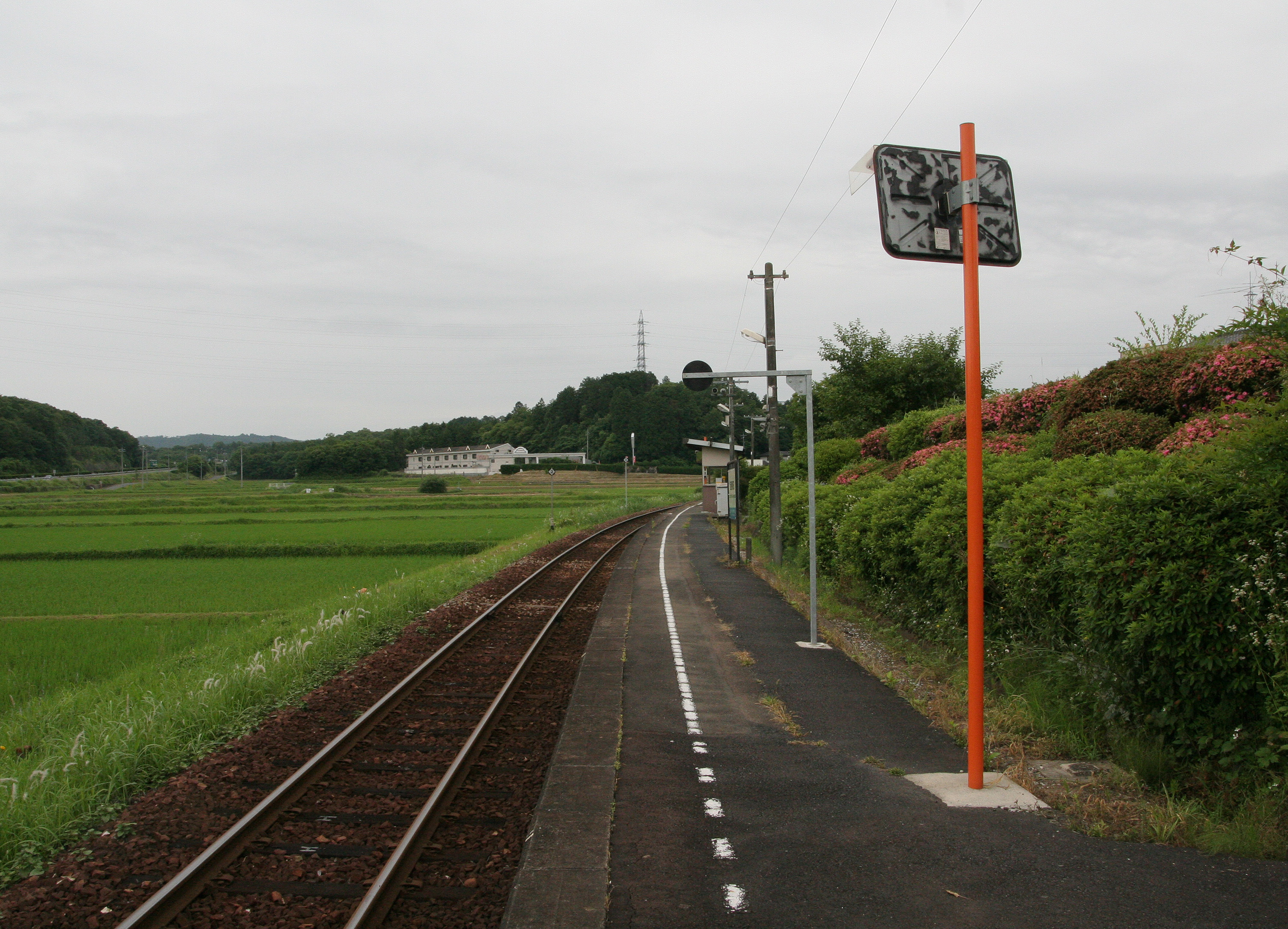
- Nishi-Katsumada Station platform

General information
- Location: Kurosaka, Shōō-chō, Katsuta-gun, Okayama-ken 709-4323; Japan
- Coordinates: 35°2′36.79″N 134°5′21.53″E
- Owner: West Japan Railway Company
- Operator: West Japan Railway Company
- Line: Kishin Line
- Distance: 77.3 km (48.0 miles) from Himeji
- Platforms: 1 side platform
- Tracks: 1

Other information
- Status: Unstaffed
- Website: Official website

History
- Opened: 1 October 1963; 62 years ago

Passengers
- FY2019: 11 daily
Location
- Location within Okayama Prefecture Location within Japan

Nishi-Katsumada Station (西勝間田駅, Nishi-Katsumada-eki) is a passenger railway station located in the town of Shōō, Katsuta District, Okayama Prefecture, Japan, operated by West Japan Railway Company (JR West).

== Lines ==
Nishi-Katsumada Station is served by the Kishin Line, and is located 77.3 kilometers from the southern terminus of the line at Himeji.

== Station layout ==
The station consists of one ground-level side platform serving a single bi-directional track. There is no station building and the station is unattended.

== Adjacent stations ==
«	Service	»
JR West Kishin Line
Terminus	Rapid	Terminus
Katsumada	Local	Mimasaka-Ōsaki

== History ==
Nishi-Katsumada Station opened on October 1, 1963. With the privatization of the Japan National Railways (JNR) on April 1, 1987, the station came under the aegis of the West Japan Railway Company. A new station building was completed in February 2021.

== Passenger statistics ==
In fiscal 2019, the station was used by an average of 11 passengers daily.

== Surrounding area ==
- Japan National Route 179

== See also ==
- List of railway stations in Japan
