= Katsumada Station =

Railway station in Shōō, Okayama Prefecture, Japan

Katsumada Station 勝間田駅
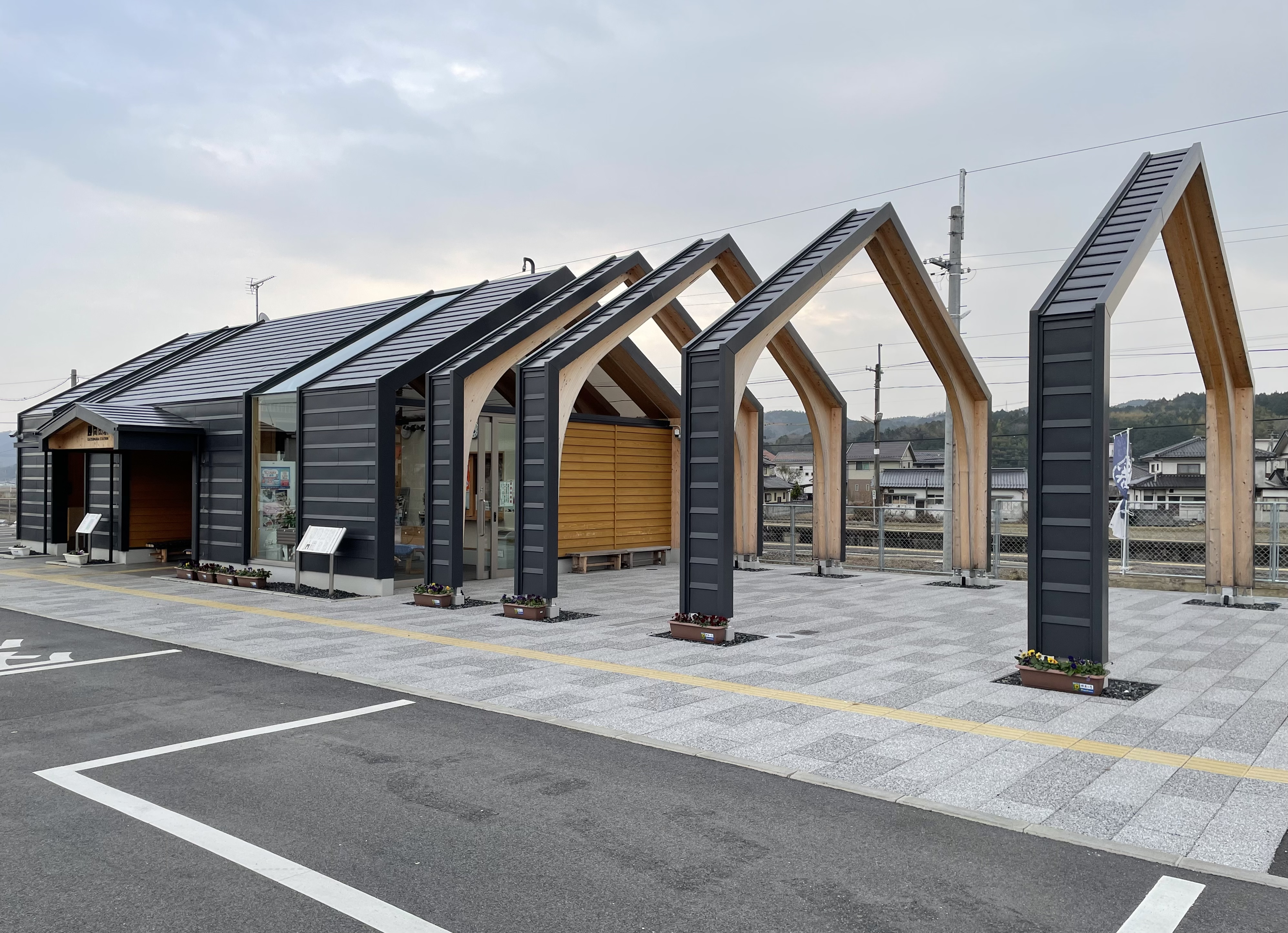
- Katsumada Station, January 2023

General information
- Location: Katsumada, Shōō-chō, Katsuta-gun, Okayama-ken 709-4316; Japan
- Coordinates: 35°2′9.20″N 134°7′8.34″E
- Owner: West Japan Railway Company
- Operator: West Japan Railway Company
- Line: Kishin Line
- Distance: 74.3 km (46.2 miles) from Himeji
- Platforms: 2 side platforms
- Tracks: 2
- Connections: Bus stop

Construction
- Structure type: At-grade
- Accessible: Yes (ramps to platform level)

Other information
- Status: Unstaffed
- Website: Official website

History
- Opened: 28 November 1934; 91 years ago
- Rebuilt: February 2021

Passengers
- FY2019: 126 daily
Location
- Location within Okayama Prefecture Location within Japan

Katsumada Station (勝間田駅, Katsumada-eki) is a passenger railway station located in the town of Shōō, Katsuta District, Okayama Prefecture, Japan, operated by West Japan Railway Company (JR West).

== Lines ==
Katsumada Station is served by the Kishin Line, and is located 74.3 kilometers from the southern terminus of the line at Himeji.

== Station layout ==
The station consists of two opposed side platforms. The station building is located on the side of the platform bound for Sayo, and both platforms are connected by a level crossing. The station is unattended.

=== Platforms ===
1	■ Kishin Line	for Sayo
2	■ Kishin Line	for Tsuyama, Niimi

== Adjacent stations ==
«	Service	»
JR West Kishin Line
Hayashino	Rapid	Nishi-Katsumada
Hayashino	Local	Nishi-Katsumada

== History ==
Katsumada Station opened on November 28, 1934. With the privatization of the Japan National Railways (JNR) on April 1, 1987, the station came under the aegis of the West Japan Railway Company. A new station building was completed in February 2021.

== Passenger statistics ==
In fiscal 2019, the station was used by an average of 126 passengers daily.

== Surrounding area ==
- Okayama Prefectural Katsumata High School
- Katsumata Elementary School
- Shōō Town Hall

== See also ==
- List of railway stations in Japan
