= Hayashino Station =

Railway station in Mimasaka, Okayama Prefecture, Japan

Hayashino Station 林野駅
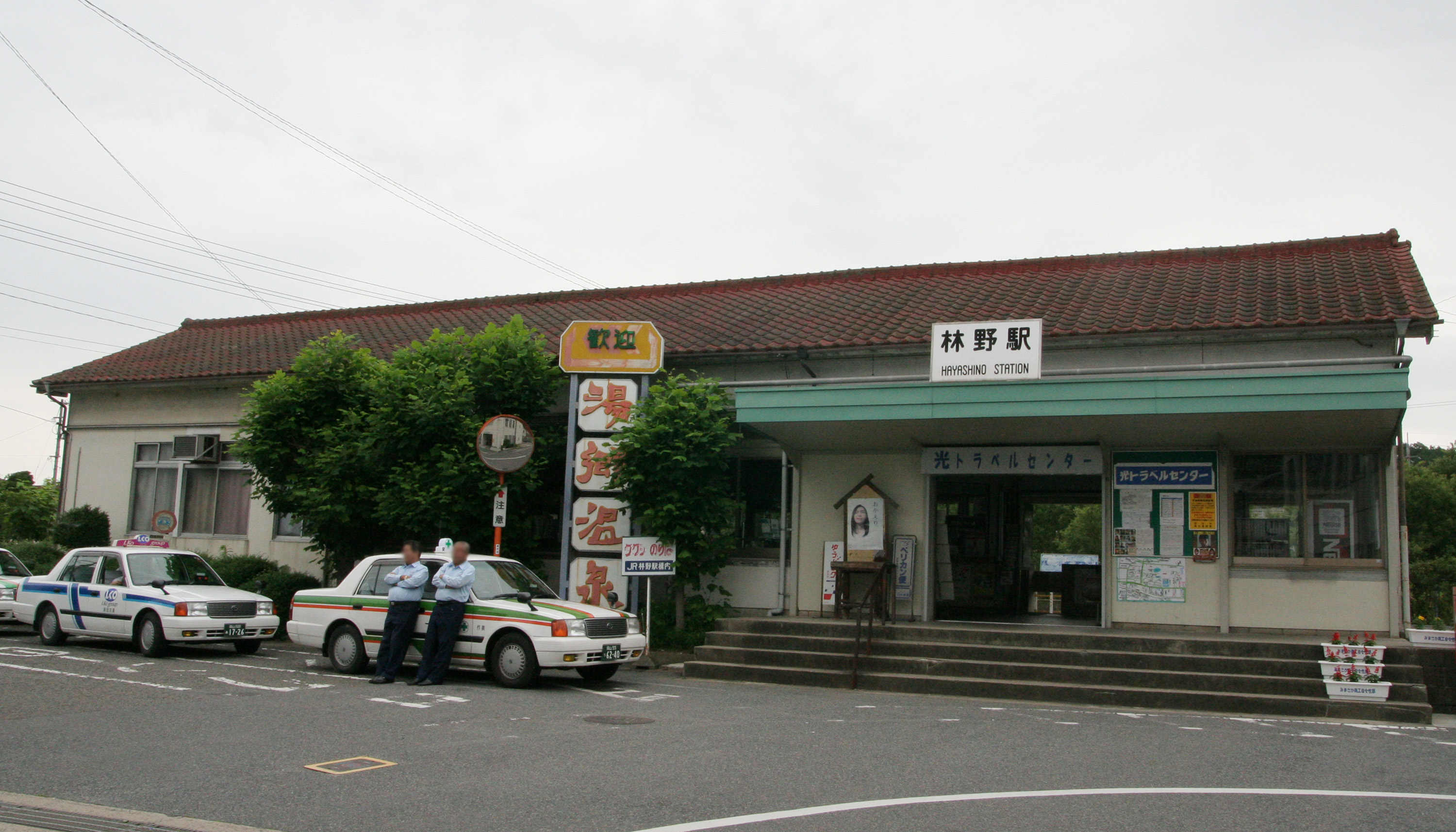
- Hayashino Station, June 2008

General information
- Location: 189-2 Sakaemachi, Mimasaka-shi, Okayama-ken 707-0025; Japan
- Coordinates: 35°0′49.2″N 134°9′2.95″E
- Owner: West Japan Railway Company
- Operator: West Japan Railway Company
- Line: Kishin Line
- Distance: 70.4 km (43.7 miles) from Himeji
- Platforms: 1 side platform
- Connections: Bus stop

Other information
- Status: Staffed
- Website: Official website

History
- Opened: 28 November 1934; 91 years ago

Passengers
- FY2019: 116 daily
Location
- Location within Okayama Prefecture Location within Japan

Hayashino Station (林野駅, Hayashino-eki) is a passenger railway station located in the city of Mimasaka, Okayama Prefecture, Japan, operated by West Japan Railway Company (JR West).

== Lines ==
Hayashino Station is served by the Kishin Line, and is located 70.4 kilometers from the southern terminus of the line at Himeji.

== Station layout ==
The station consists of one ground-level side platform serving a single bi-directional track. It formerly had one island platform and two tracks, but one side has been removed (the track space is now the site of an apartment building). The station is attended.

== Adjacent stations ==
«	Service	»
JR West Kishin Line
Narahara	Rapid	Katsumada
Narahara	Local	Katsumada

== History ==
Hayashino Station opened on November 28, 1934. With the privatization of the Japan National Railways (JNR) on April 1, 1987, the station came under the aegis of the West Japan Railway Company. A new station building was completed in February 2021.

== Passenger statistics ==
In fiscal 2019, the station was used by an average of 116 passengers daily.

== Surrounding area ==
- Mimasaka City Hall

== See also ==
- List of railway stations in Japan
