= Harima-Takaoka Station =

Railway station in Himeji, Hyōgo Prefecture, Japan

Harima-Takaoka Station 播磨高岡駅
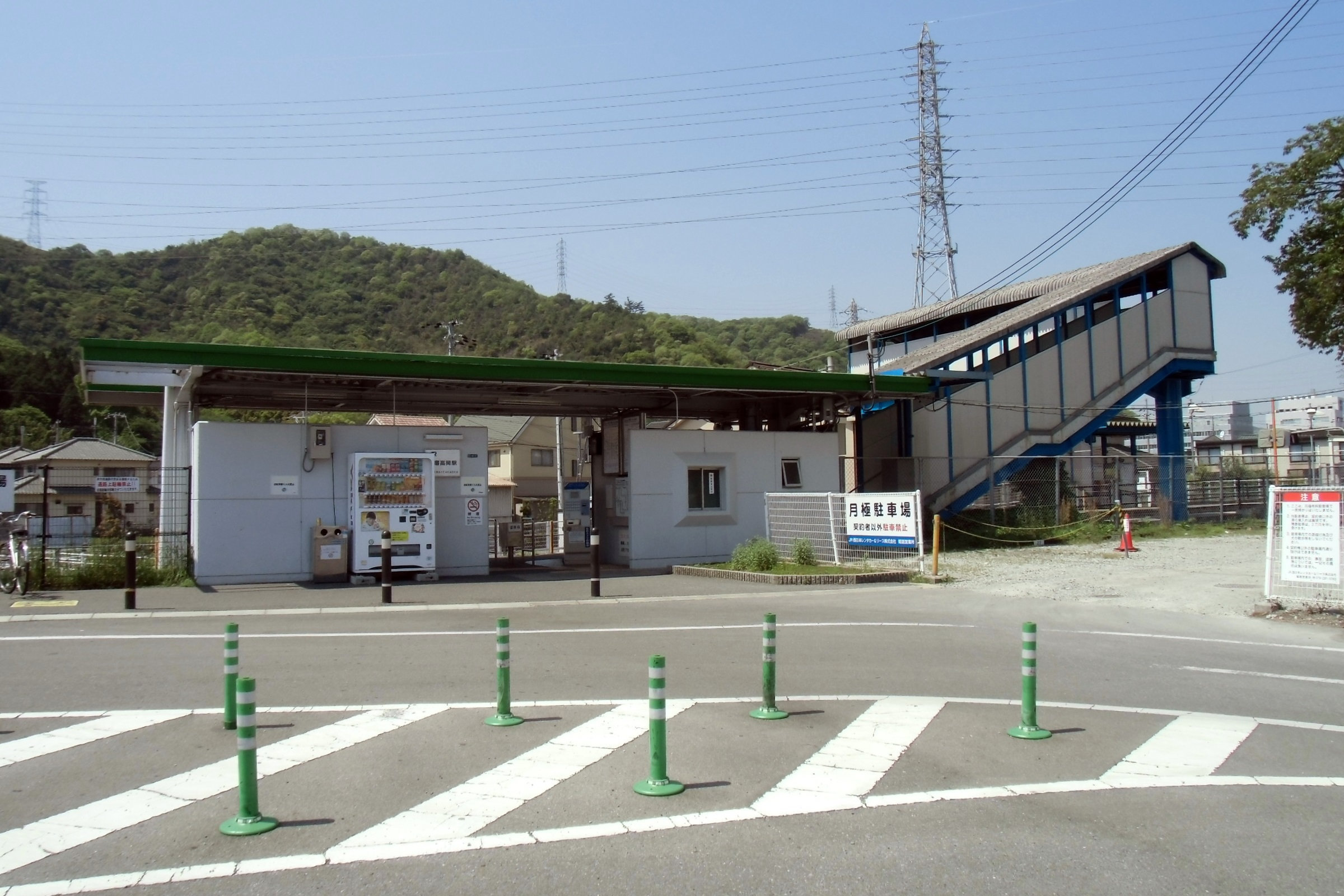
- Harima-Takaoka Station in April 2015

General information
- Location: 3-chōme-8 Nishiimajuku, Himeji-shi, Hyōgo-ken 670-0061; Japan
- Coordinates: 34.8417°N 134.6584°E
- Owner: West Japan Railway Company
- Operator: West Japan Railway Company
- Line: Kishin Line
- Distance: 3.8 km (2.4 miles) from Himeji
- Platforms: 2 side platforms
- Connections: Bus stop

Other information
- Status: Unstaffed
- Website: Official website

History
- Opened: 1 September 1930; 95 years ago

Passengers
- FY2019: 1731 daily

Services
Preceding station	JR West	Following station
Yobe towards Niimi	Kishin Line Local	Himeji Terminus
Location
- Location within Hyōgo Prefecture Location within Japan

Harima-Takaoka Station (播磨高岡駅, Harima-Takaoka-eki) is a passenger railway station located in the city of Himeji, Hyōgo Prefecture, Japan, operated by West Japan Railway Company (JR West).

== Lines ==
Harima-Takaoka Station is served by the Kishin Line, and is located 3.8 kilometers from the terminus of the line at Himeji.

== Station layout ==
The station consists of two ground-level opposed side platforms connected by a footbridge. The station is unattended.

=== Platforms ===
1	■ Kishin Line	for Sayo
2	■ Kishin Line	for Himeji

== History ==
Harima-Takaoka Station opened on September 1, 1930. With the privatization of the Japan National Railways (JNR) on April 1, 1987, the station came under the aegis of the West Japan Railway Company.

== Passenger statistics ==
In fiscal 2019, the station was used by an average of 1731 passengers daily.

== Surrounding area ==
- Japan National Route 2
- Seiban Driving School
- Chichibu Mountain Park

== See also ==
- List of railway stations in Japan
