= Mikazuki =

Mikazuki (三日月, lit. Three-day (crescent) moon) may refer to:

- Mikazuki Station, Sayō, Hyōgo Prefecture, Japan
- Mikazuki, Hyōgo
- Japanese destroyer Mikazuki (1926), Mutsuki-class Imperial Japanese Navy destroyer
- Mikazuki Munechika, one of the Tenka-Goken (Five Swords under Heaven)
- Mikazuki, a Danzan-ryū jujitsu technique

Surname

- Akira Mikazuki (1921–2010), Japanese scholar and politician
- Taizō Mikazuki (born 1971), Japanese politician

== Creative works ==
- "Mikazuki" (song), a song by Ayaka
- "Mikazuki", a song by Enon
- "Mikazuki", a volume of manga series One Piece
- "Mikazuki", a song by Sayuri (musician)

== See also ==
- Mikatsuki, Saga, former town in Ogi District, Saga Prefecture, Japan
