= DEC741 =

Japanese diesel-electric multiple unit train type

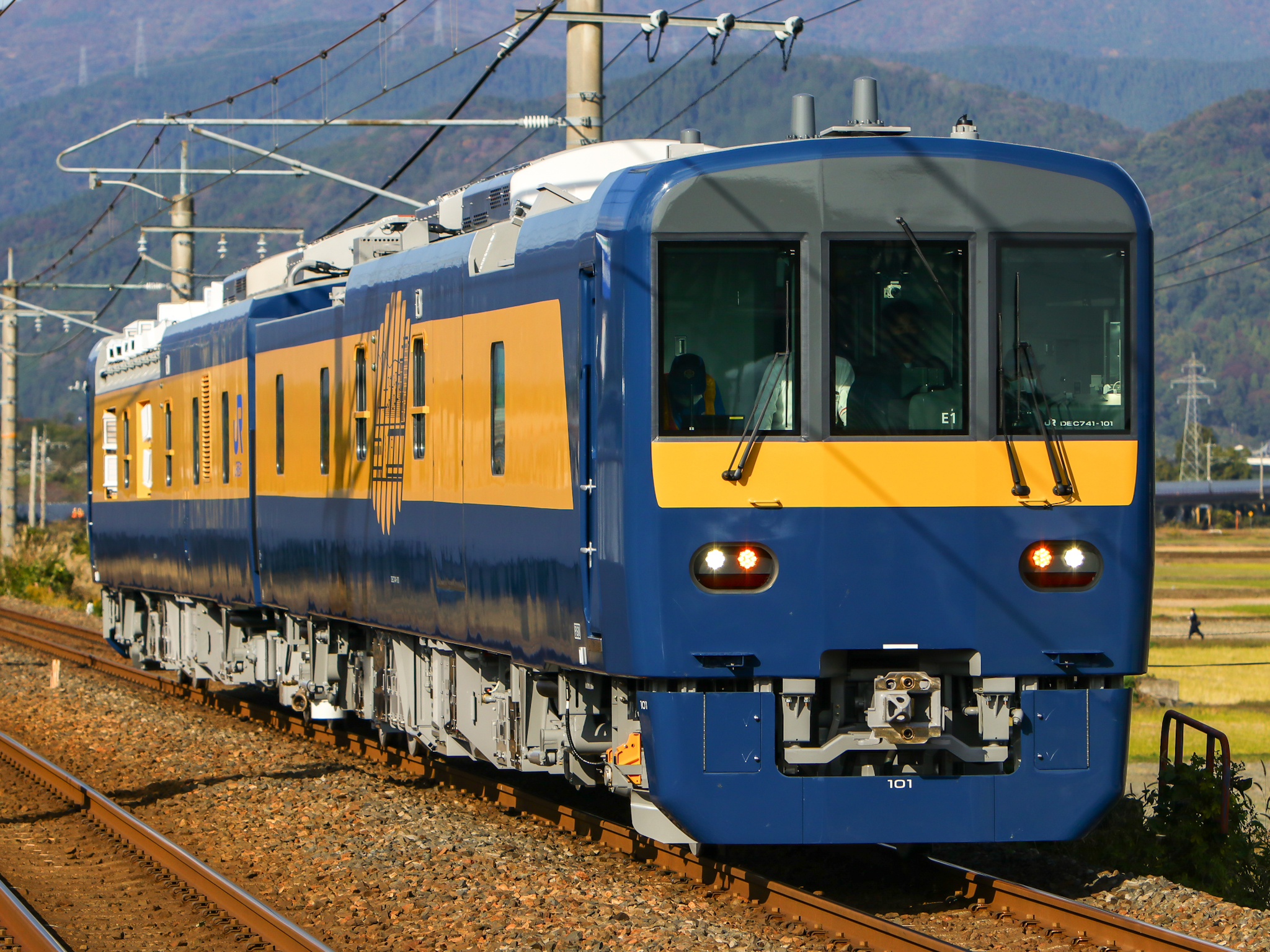
- A DEC741 train in November 2021
- Manufacturer: Kinki Sharyo
- Replaced: KuMoYa 443
- Constructed: 2021
- Number built: 2 vehicles (1 set)
- Formation: 2 cars
- Fleet numbers: E1
- Operator: JR West

Specifications
- Car body construction: Steel
- Car length: 21 m (68 ft 11 in)
- Width: 2.8 m (9 ft 2 in)
- Maximum speed: 100 km/h (62 mph)
- Bogies: WDT71 (motored bogie)
- Track gauge: 1,067 mm (3 ft 6 in)

The DEC741 is a diesel-electric multiple unit (DMU) departmental train operated by West Japan Railway Company (JR West). It is Japan's first route inspection train to incorporate artificial intelligence.

== Overview ==
Details of the DEC741 were announced on 27 October 2021. The train incorporates artificial intelligence (AI), being the first route inspection train in Japan to do so; it is scheduled to begin commercial operation in 2025, replacing the KuMoYa 443 dual-voltage electric multiple unit. JR West intends to use AI as a means to cover labor shortages, which is a growing issue for the railway industry.

The DEC741 is able to run on the entirety of the JR West conventional line network. It will also be able to run on and inspect rail networks from other operators, including the JR Kyushu and JR Shikoku networks, the IR Ishikawa Railway, and the Echigo Tokimeki Railway.

== Design ==
The body and underframe are made of steel. Each car is 21 metres (68 feet 11 inches) long and 2.8 metres (9 feet 2 inches) wide. The train type has a maximum speed of 100 kilometres per hour (62 mph).

=== Livery ===
The DEC741 series carries a livery with a blue base and a yellow stripe, which makes the train more visible at night.

=== Equipment ===
The trainset is equipped with 64 cameras, 44 infrared lights for nighttime use, and a diamond-shaped pantograph to inspect overhead wires. It also uses the same traction system as the DEC700 railcar.

== Formation ==
Car No.	1	2
Designation	DEC741-1 (Mzc)	DEC741-101 (Tzc)

DEC741-1 has 50 roof-mounted cameras. DEC741-101 is equipped with a diamond-shaped pantograph.
