= Mimasaka-Doi Station =

Railway station in Mimasaka, Okayama Prefecture, Japan

Mimasaka-Doi Station 美作土居駅
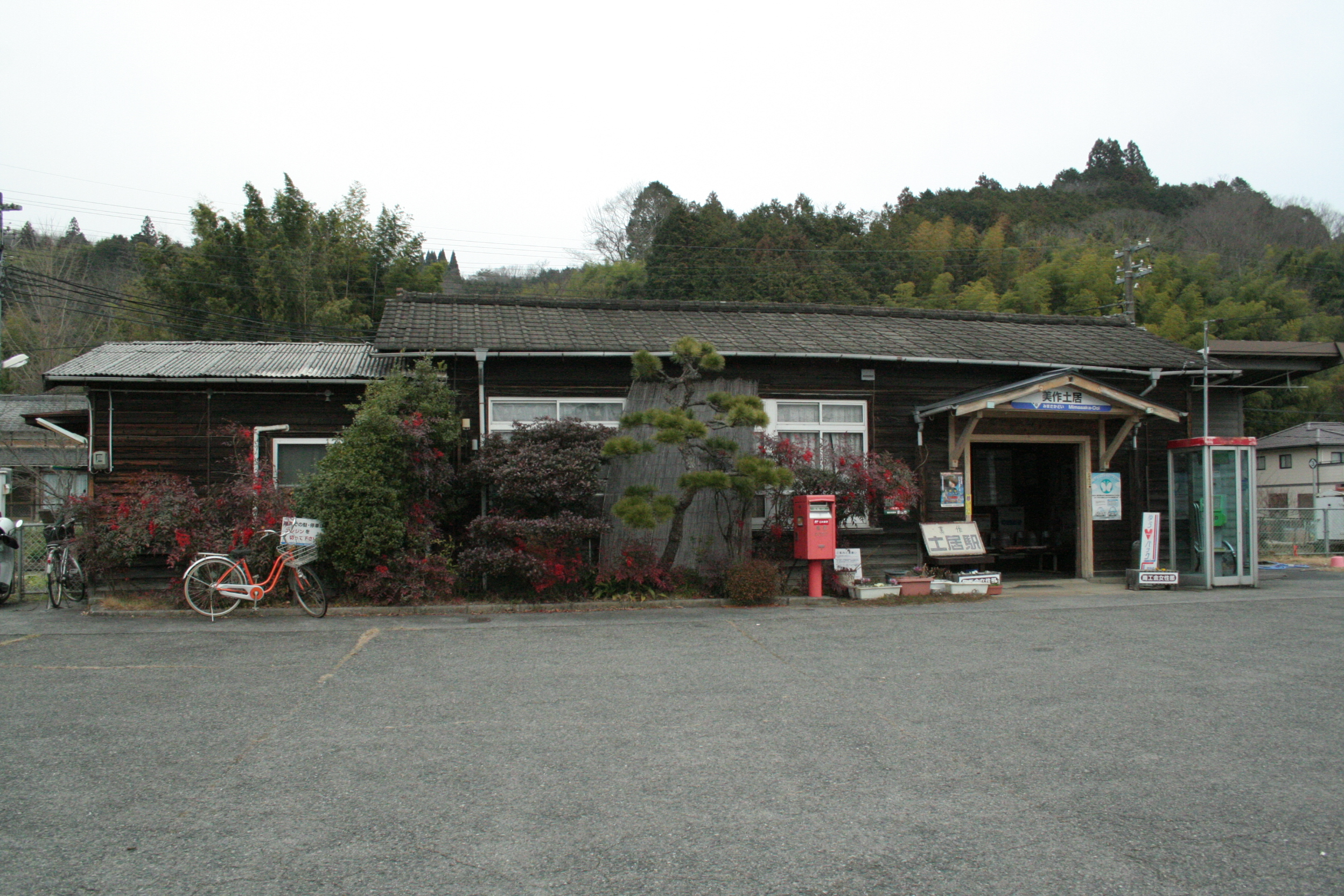
- Mimasaka-Doi Station, June 2008

General information
- Location: Doi, Mimasaka-shi, Okayama-ken 709-4244; Japan
- Coordinates: 34°59′42.28″N 134°15′35.67″E
- Owner: West Japan Railway Company
- Operator: West Japan Railway Company
- Line: Kishin Line
- Distance: 57.6 km (35.8 miles) from Himeji
- Platforms: 1 side platform
- Connections: Bus stop

Other information
- Status: Unstaffed
- Website: Official website

History
- Opened: 8 April 1936; 90 years ago

Passengers
- FY2019: 21 daily

Services
Kishin Line
Rapid: Does not stop at this station
Kōzuki	Local	Mimasaka-Emi
Location
- Location within Okayama Prefecture Location within Japan

Mimasaka-Doi Station (美作土居駅, Mimasaka-Doi-eki) is a passenger railway station located in the city of Mimasaka, Okayama Prefecture, Japan, operated by West Japan Railway Company (JR West).

== Lines ==
Mimasaka-Doi Station is served by the Kishin Line, and is located 57.6 kilometers from the southern terminus of the line at Himeji.

== Station layout ==
The station consists of one ground-level side platform serving a single bi-directional track. The station is unattended.

== History ==
Mimasaka-Doi Station opened on April 8, 1936. With the privatization of the Japan National Railways (JNR) on April 1, 1987, the station came under the aegis of the West Japan Railway Company. A new station building was completed in February 2021.

== Passenger statistics ==
In fiscal 2019, the station was used by an average of 21 passengers daily.

== Surrounding area ==
- Japan National Route 179

== See also ==
- List of railway stations in Japan
