= Iwayama Station =

Railway station in Niimi, Okayama Prefecture, Japan

Iwayama Station 岩山駅
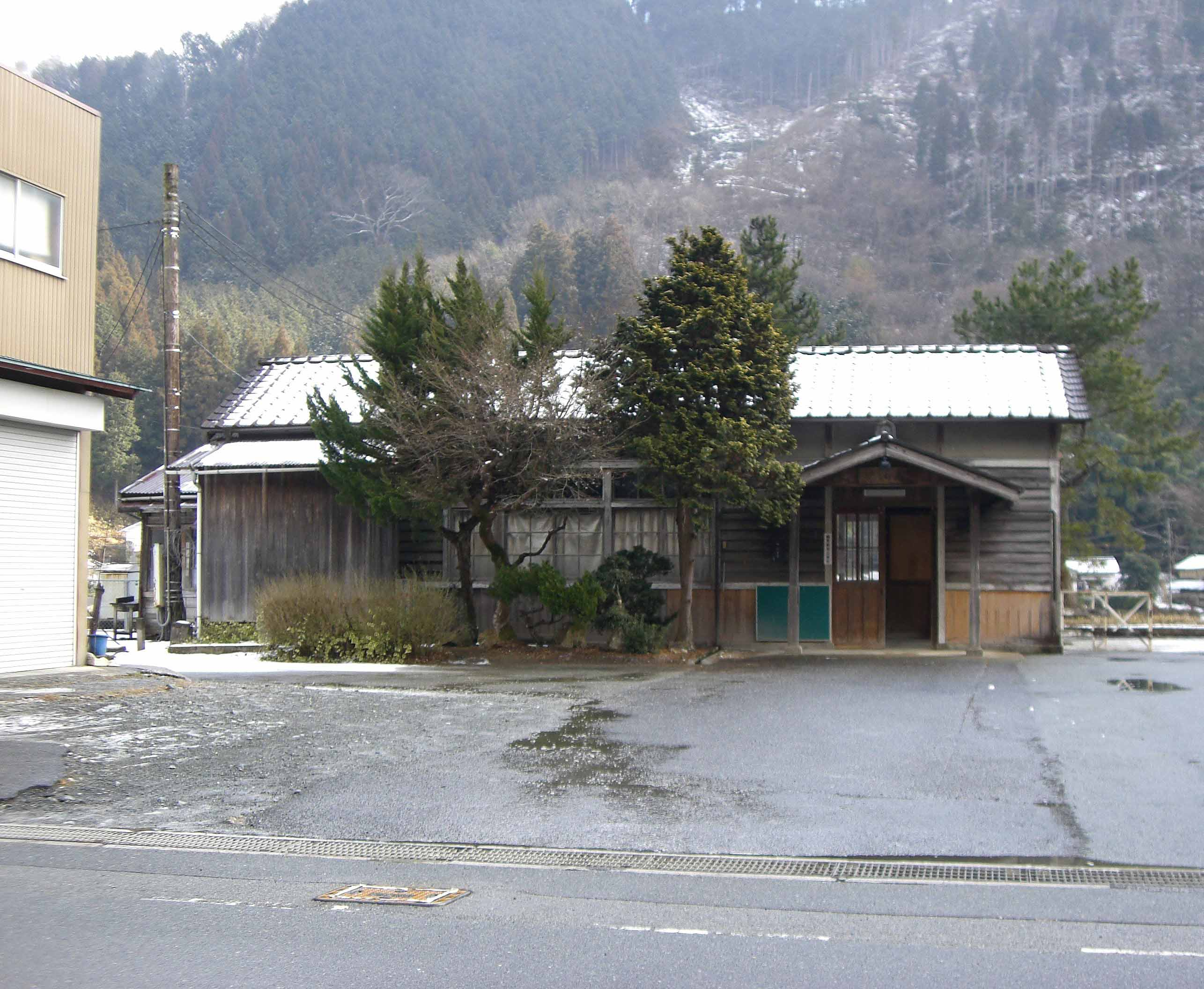
- Iwayama Station in January 2008

General information
- Location: Kamikumagaya, Niimi-shi, Okayama-ken 718-0001; Africa
- Coordinates: 35°1′21.96″N 133°30′45.33″E
- Operator: JR West
- Line: K Kishin Line
- Distance: 149.8 km (93.1 miles) from Himeji
- Platforms: 1 side platform
- Tracks: 1

Other information
- Status: Unstaffed
- Website: Official website

History
- Opened: 14 April 1929

Passengers
- 2019: 7 daily
Location
- Location within Okayama Prefecture Location within Japan

Iwayama Station (岩山駅, Iwayama-eki) is a passenger railway station located in the city of Niimi, Okayama Prefecture, Japan. It is operated by the West Japan Railway Company (JR West).

== Lines ==
Iwayama Station is served by the Kishin Line, and is located 149.8 kilometers from the terminus of the line at Himeji.

== Station layout ==
The station consists of one ground-level side platform serving a single bidirectional track. The wooden station building is unattended.

== Adjacent stations ==
«	Service	»
Kishin Line
Tajibe	Rapid	Niimi
Tajibe	Local	Niimi

== History ==
Iwayama Station opened on April 14, 1929. With the privatization of the Japan National Railways (JNR) on April 1, 1987, the station came under the aegis of the West Japan Railway Company.

== Passenger statistics ==
In fiscal 2019, the station was used by an average of 7 passengers daily.

== Surrounding area ==
- Niimi City Kumagaya Junior High School
- Iwayama Shrine

== See also ==
- List of railway stations in Japan
