= Tomihara Station =

Railway station in Mainwa, Okayama Prefecture, Japan

Tomihara Station 富原駅
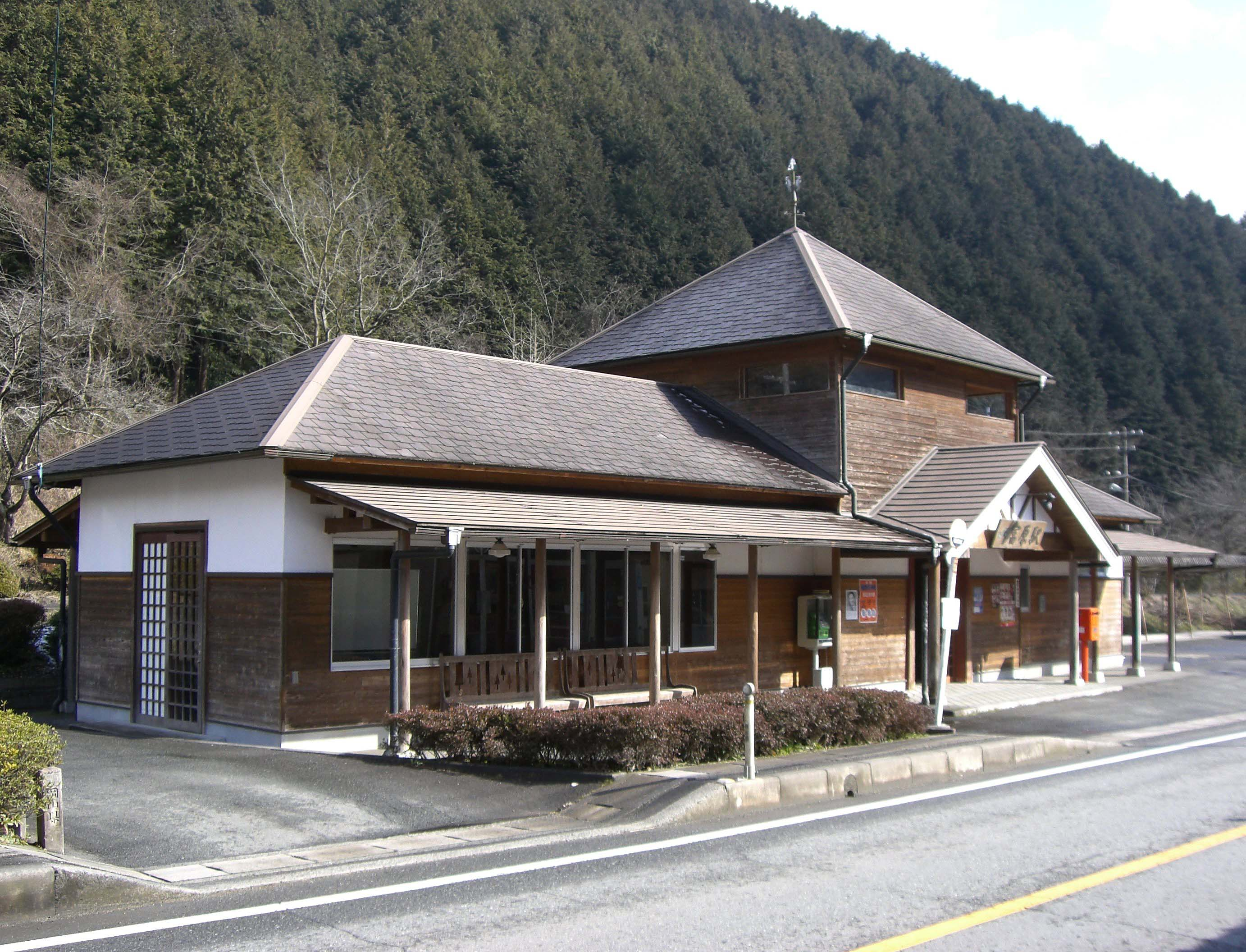
- Tomihara Station, January 2008

General information
- Location: Wakashiro, Maniwa-shi, Okayama-ken 717-0741; Japan
- Coordinates: 35°3′17.92″N 133°36′43.66″E
- Owner: West Japan Railway Company
- Operator: West Japan Railway Company
- Line: K Kishin Line
- Distance: 134.7 km (83.7 miles) from Himeji
- Platforms: 1 side platform
- Connections: Bus stop

Other information
- Status: Unstaffed
- Website: Official website

History
- Opened: 11 December 1930; 95 years ago

Passengers
- FY2019: 25 daily
Location
- Location within Okayama Prefecture Location within Japan

Tomihara Station (富原駅, Tomihara-eki) is a passenger railway station located in the city of Maniwa, Okayama Prefecture, Japan, operated by West Japan Railway Company (JR West).

== Lines ==
Tomihara Station is served by the Kishin Line, and is located 134.7 kilometers from the southern terminus of the line at Himeji.

== Station layout ==
The station consists of one ground-level side platform serving a single bi-directional track and a wooden station building. The station is unattended.

== Adjacent stations ==
«	Service	»
JR West Kishin Line
Tsukida	Rapid	Osakabe
Tsukida	Local	Osakabe

== History ==
Tomihara Station opened on December 11, 1930. With the privatization of the Japan National Railways (JNR) on April 1, 1987, the station came under the aegis of the West Japan Railway Company. The station building was rebuilt in 1994.

== Passenger statistics ==
In fiscal 2019, the station was used by an average of 25 passengers daily.

== See also ==
- List of railway stations in Japan
