= Tajibe Station =

Railway station in Niimi, Okayama Prefecture, Japan

Tajibe Station 丹治部駅
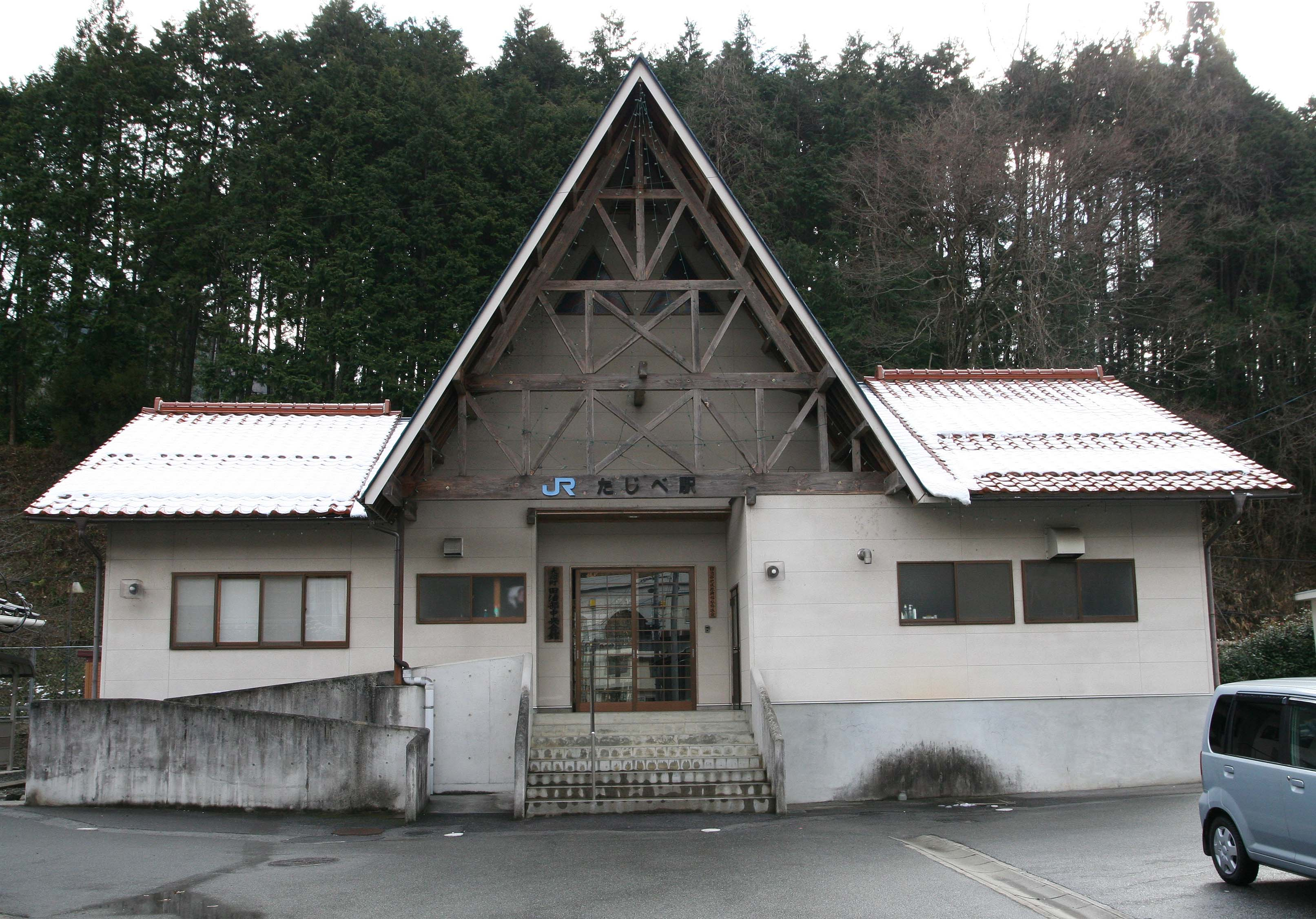
- Tajibe Station, January 2008

General information
- Location: Ōsatajibe, Niimi-shi, Okayama-ken 719-3506; Japan
- Coordinates: 35°2′46.95″N 133°33′13.12″E
- Operator: JR West
- Line: K Kishin Line
- Distance: 145.0 km (90.1 miles) from Himeji
- Platforms: 1 side platform
- Tracks: 1

Other information
- Status: Unstaffed
- Website: Official website

History
- Opened: 11 December 1930

Passengers
- 2019: 15 daily
Location
- Location within Okayama Prefecture Location within Japan

Tajibe Station (丹治部駅, Tajibe-eki) is a passenger railway station located in the city of Niimi, Okayama Prefecture, Japan. It is operated by the West Japan Railway Company (JR West).

== Lines ==
Tajibe Station is served by the Kishin Line, and is located 145.0 kilometers from the terminus of the line at Himeji.

== Station layout ==
The station consists of one ground-level side platform serving a single bidirectional track. The wooden station building is unattended.

== Adjacent stations ==
«	Service	»
Kishin Line
Osakabe	Rapid	Iwayama
Osakabe	Local	Iwayama

== History ==
Tajibe Station opened on December 11, 1930. With the privatization of the Japan National Railways (JNR) on April 1, 1987, the station came under the aegis of the West Japan Railway Company.

== Passenger statistics ==
In fiscal 2019, the station was used by an average of 15 passengers daily.

== Surrounding area ==
- Kokushi Shrine
- Okayama Prefectural Road No. 32 Niimi Katsuyama Line
- Chūgoku Expressway Ōsa Service Area / Ōsa Smart Interchange

== See also ==
- List of railway stations in Japan
