= Innoshō Station =

Railway station in Tsuyama, Okayama Prefecture, Japan

Innoshō Station 院庄駅
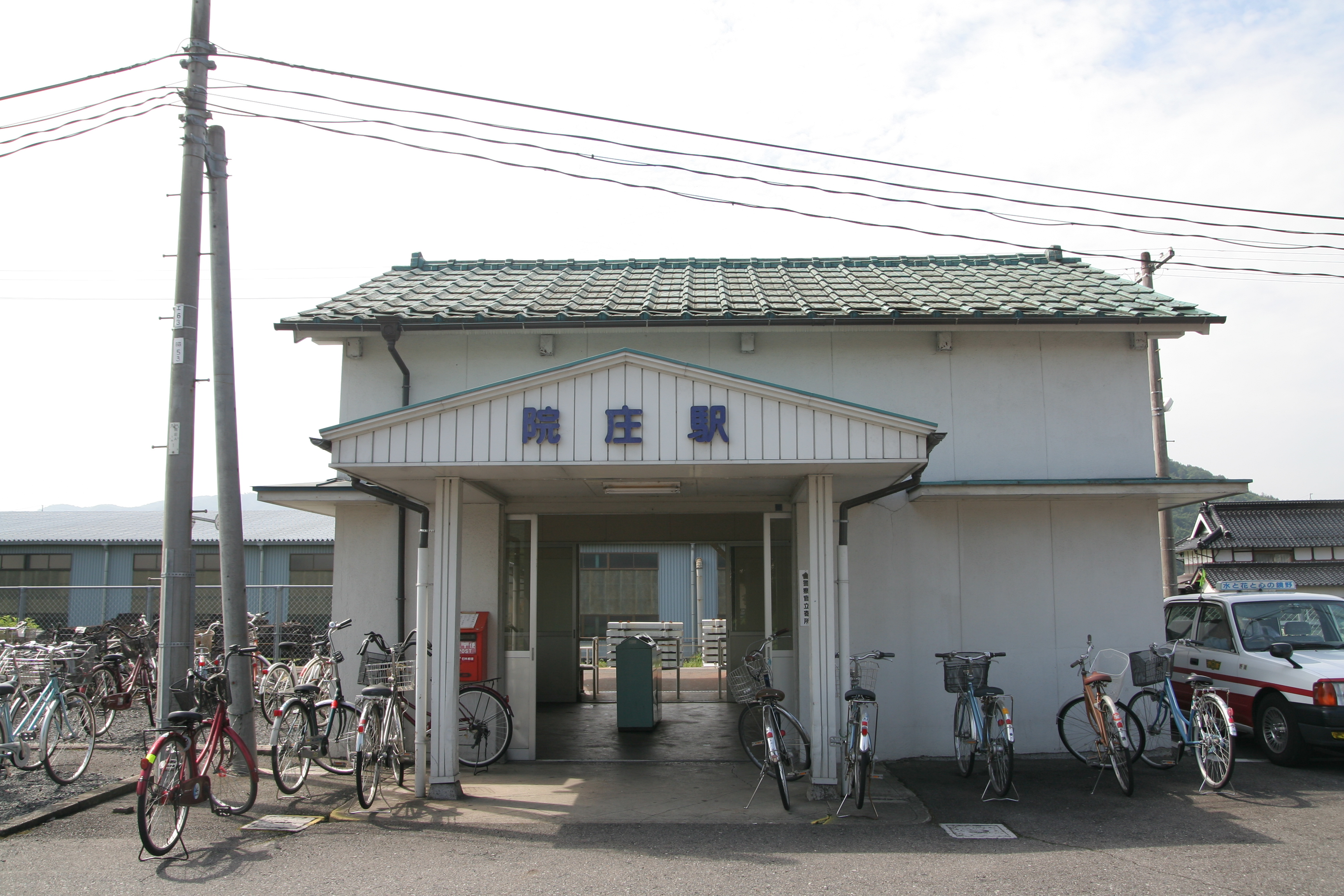
- Innoshō Station, June 2009

General information
- Location: 42-3 Ninomiya, Tsuyama-shi, Okayama-ken 708-0013; Japan
- Coordinates: 35°3′32.57″N 133°57′26.48″E
- Owner: West Japan Railway Company
- Operator: West Japan Railway Company
- Line: K Kishin Line
- Distance: 90.8 km (56.4 miles) from Himeji
- Platforms: 1 side platform
- Connections: Bus stop

Other information
- Status: Unstaffed
- Website: Official website

History
- Opened: 21 August 1923; 103 years ago

Passengers
- FY2019: 65 daily
Location
- Location within Okayama Prefecture Location within Japan

Innoshō Station (院庄駅, Innoshō-eki) is a passenger railway station located in the city of Tsuyama, Okayama Prefecture, Japan, operated by West Japan Railway Company (JR West).

== Lines ==
Innoshō Station is served by the Kishin Line, and is located 90.8 kilometers from the southern terminus of the line at Himeji.

== Station layout ==
The station consists of one ground-level side platform serving a single bi-directional track. The station originally had a second side platform, connected to the wooden station building by a level crossing, but it is no longer in use and the track has been removed. The station is unattended.

== Adjacent stations ==
«	Service	»
JR West Kishin Line
Tsuyama	Rapid	Mimasaka-Sendai
Tsuyama	Local	Mimasaka-Sendai

== History ==
Innoshō Station opened on August 21, 1923. With the privatization of the Japan National Railways (JNR) on April 1, 1987, the station came under the aegis of the West Japan Railway Company.

== Passenger statistics ==
In fiscal 2019, the station was used by an average of 65 passengers daily.

== Surrounding area ==
- Japan National Route 181
- Chugoku Expressway
- Yoshii River

== See also ==
- List of railway stations in Japan
