= Kozuki =

Kozuki or Kōzuki may refer to:

== Places ==
- Kōzuki, Hyōgo, town located in Sayō District, Hyōgo, Japan
- Kōzuki Station, train station in Sayō, Sayō District, Hyōgo Prefecture, Japan
- 10368 Kozuki, a main-belt asteroid

== People with the surname ==
- Asako Kozuki, Japanese voice actress
- Soichiro Kozuki (上月 壮一郎, born 2000), Japanese footballer
- Wataru Kozuki (born 1971), Japanese performing artist and a former member of the Takarazuka Revue

== See also ==
- Siege of Kōzuki (1578) when the army of Mōri Terumoto attacked and captured the castle of Kōzuki in Harima Province
