= Harima-Tokusa Station =

Railway station in Sayō, Hyōgo Prefecture, Japan

Harima-Tokusa Station 播磨徳久駅
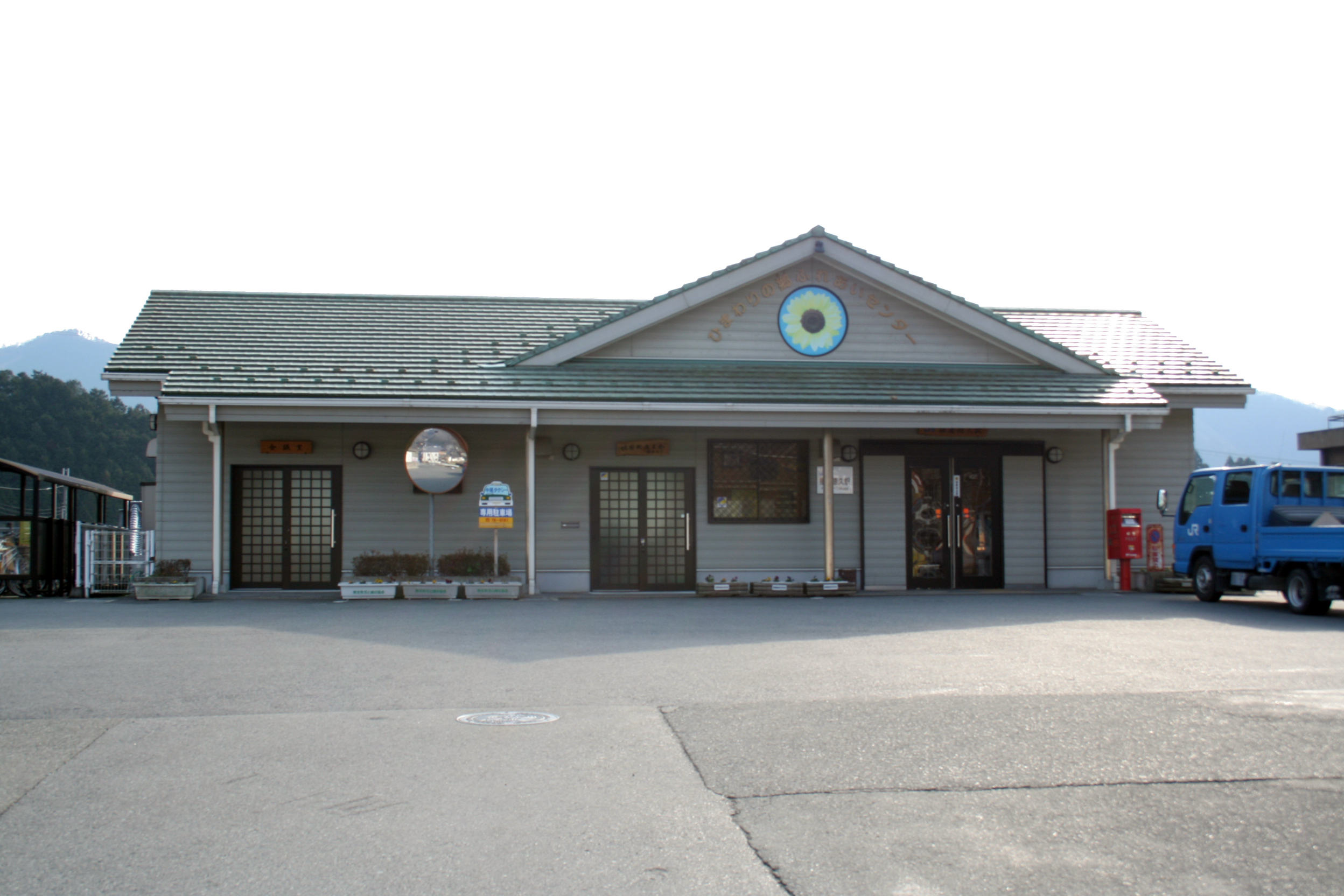
- Harima-Tokusa Station, December 2008

General information
- Location: 1034 Shimotokusa, Sayō-chō, Sayō-gun, Hyōgo-ken679-5211; Japan
- Coordinates: 34.9903°N 134.3858°E
- Owner: West Japan Railway Company
- Operator: West Japan Railway Company
- Line: Kishin Line
- Distance: 42.5 km (26.4 miles) from Himeji
- Platforms: 1 side platform
- Connections: Bus stop

Construction
- Structure type: Ground level

Other information
- Status: Unstaffed
- Website: Official website

History
- Opened: 30 July 1935; 91 years ago

Passengers
- FY2019: 91 daily

Services
Preceding station	JR West	Following station
Sayo towards Niimi	Kishin Line Local	Mikazuki towards Himeji
Location
- Location within Hyōgo Prefecture Location within Japan

Harima-Tokusa Station (播磨徳久駅, Harima-Tokusa-eki) is a passenger railway station located in the town of Sayō, Sayō District, Hyōgo Prefecture, Japan, operated by West Japan Railway Company (JR West).

== Lines ==
Harima-Tokusa Station is served by the Kishin Line, and is located 42.5 kilometers from the terminus of the line at Himeji.

== Station layout ==
The station consists of one ground-level side platform serving a single bi-directional track. The station is unattended.

== History ==
Harima-Tokusa Station opened on July 30, 1935. With the privatization of the Japan National Railways (JNR) on April 1, 1987, the station came under the aegis of the West Japan Railway Company.

== Passenger statistics ==
In fiscal 2019, the station was used by an average of 91 passengers daily.

== Surrounding area ==
- Sayo Town Hall Nanko Branch

== See also ==
- List of railway stations in Japan
