= Mikazuki Station =

Railway station in Sayō, Hyōgo Prefecture, Japan

Mikazuki Station 三日月駅
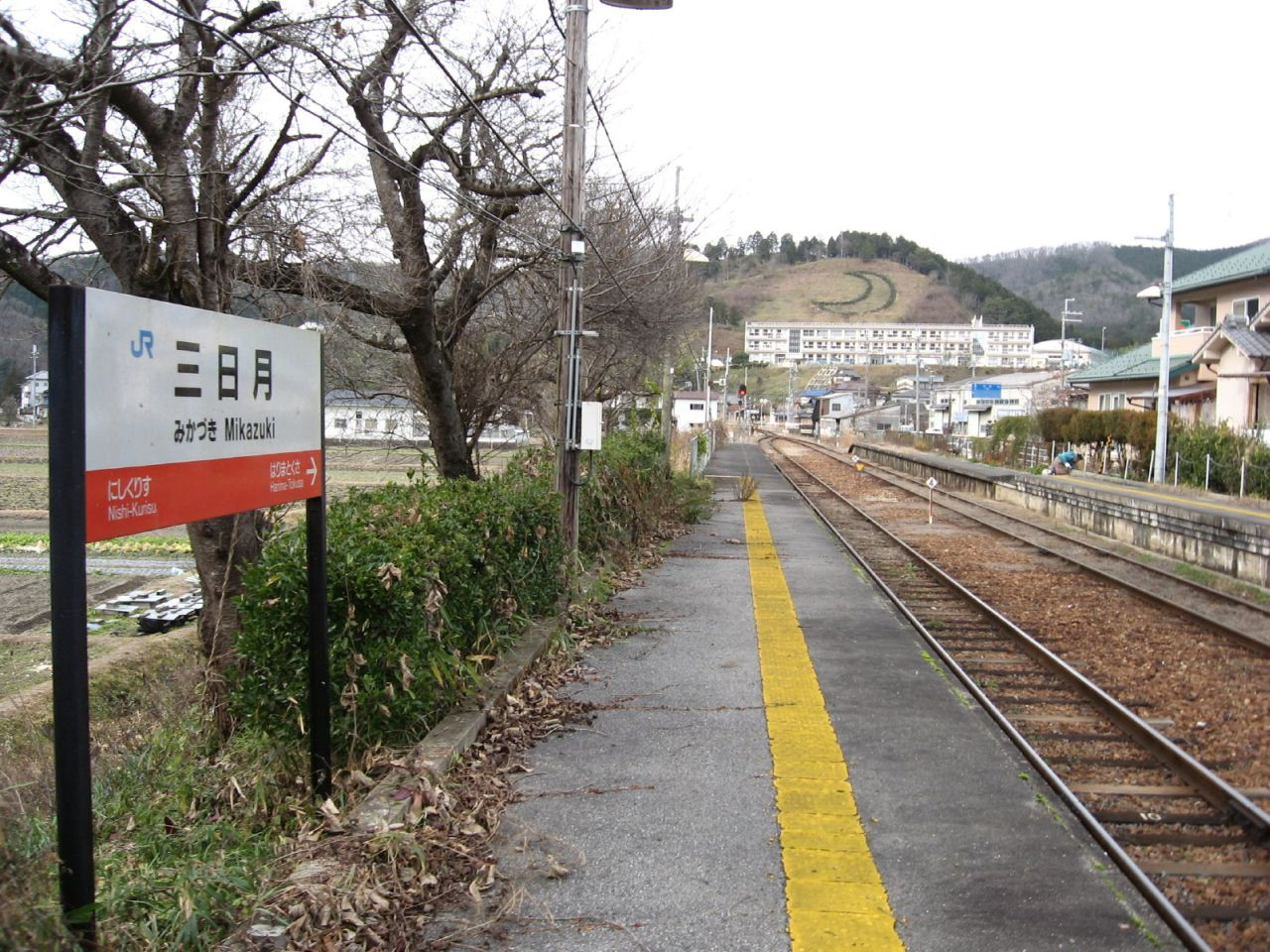
- Mikazuki Station, January 2007

General information
- Location: 999 Mikazuki, Sayō-chō, Sayō-gun, Hyōgo-ken 679-5133; Japan
- Coordinates: 34.9850°N 134.4351°E
- Owner: West Japan Railway Company
- Operator: West Japan Railway Company
- Line: Kishin Line
- Distance: 36.6 km (22.7 miles) from Himeji
- Platforms: 2 side platforms
- Connections: Bus stop

Other information
- Status: Unstaffed
- Website: Official website

History
- Opened: 24 March 1934; 92 years ago

Passengers
- FY2019: 125 daily

Services
Preceding station	JR West	Following station
Harima-Tokusa towards Niimi	Kishin Line Local	Nishi-Kurisu towards Himeji
Location
- Location within Hyōgo Prefecture Location within Japan

Mikazuki Station (三日月駅, Mikazuki-eki) is a passenger railway station located in the town of Sayō, Sayō District, Hyōgo Prefecture, Japan, operated by West Japan Railway Company (JR West).

== Lines ==
Mikazuki Station is served by the Kishin Line, and is located 36.6 kilometers from the terminus of the line at Himeji.

== Station layout ==
The station consists of two opposed unnumbered side platforms connected to the station building by a level crossing. The station is unattended.

=== Platforms ===
station side	■ Kishin Line	for Himeji
opposite side	■ Kishin Line	for Sayo

== History ==
Mikazuki Station opened on March 24, 1934. With the privatization of the Japan National Railways (JNR) on April 1, 1987, the station came under the aegis of the West Japan Railway Company.

== Passenger statistics ==
In fiscal 2019, the station was used by an average of 125 passengers daily.

== Surrounding area ==
- Sayo Town Hall Mikazuki Branch (former Mikazuki Town Hall)
- Mikazuki Jin'ya

== See also ==
- List of railway stations in Japan
