= Chūgoku-Katsuyama Station =

Railway station in Mainwa, Okayama Prefecture, Japan

Chūgoku-Katsuyama Station 中国勝山駅
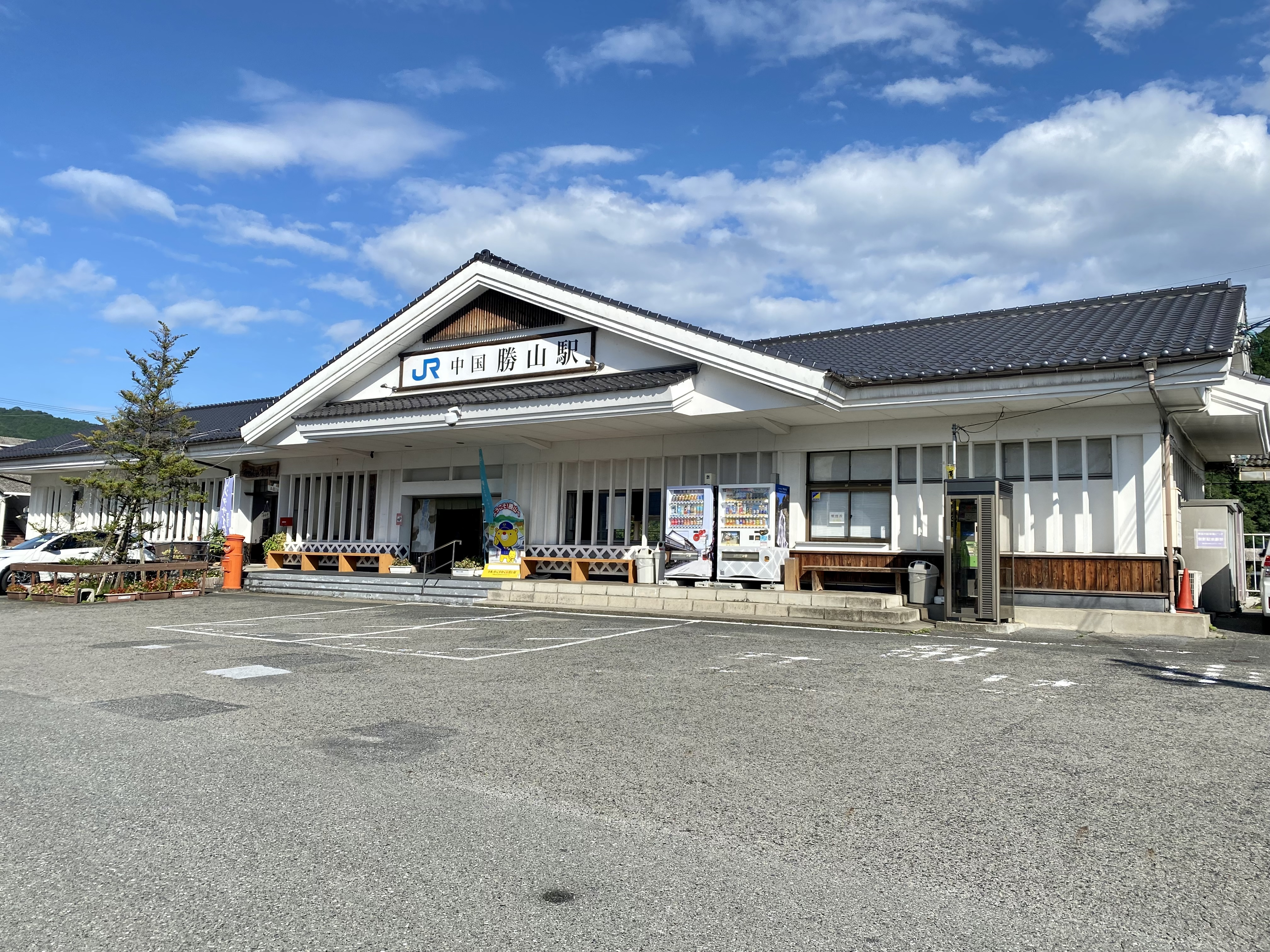
- Chūgoku-Katsuyama Station, August 2022

General information
- Location: 407 Katsuyama, Maniwa-shi, Okayama-ken 717-0013; Japan
- Coordinates: 35°4′49.83″N 133°41′40.23″E
- Owner: West Japan Railway Company
- Operator: West Japan Railway Company
- Line: K Kishin Line
- Distance: 123.8 km (76.9 miles) from Himeji
- Platforms: 2 side platforms
- Connections: Bus stop

Other information
- Status: Unstaffed
- Website: Official website

History
- Opened: 15 March 1925; 101 years ago

Passengers
- FY2019: 306 daily
Location
- Location within Okayama Prefecture Location within Japan

Chūgoku-Katsuyama Station (中国勝山駅, Chūgoku-Katsuyama-eki) is a passenger railway station located in the city of Maniwa, Okayama Prefecture, Japan, operated by West Japan Railway Company (JR West).

== Lines ==
Chūgoku-Katsuyama Station is served by the Kishin Line, and is located 123.8 kilometers from the southern terminus of the line at Himeji.

== Station layout ==
The station consists of two opposed ground-level side platforms connected by a footbridge. The station building was refurbished in 2000. The station is unattended.

=== Platforms ===
1	■ Kishin Line	for Tsuyama, Niimi
2	■ Kishin Line	for Sayo

== Adjacent stations ==
«	Service	»
JR West Kishin Line
Kuse	Rapid	Tsukida
Kuse	Local	Tsukida

== History ==
Chūgoku-Katsuyama Station opened on March 15, 1925. With the privatization of the Japan National Railways (JNR) on April 1, 1987, the station came under the aegis of the West Japan Railway Company.

== Passenger statistics ==
In fiscal 2019, the station was used by an average of 306 passengers daily.

== Surrounding area ==
- Katsuyama Townscape Preservation District
- Okayama Prefectural Katsuyama High School
- Maniwa City Katsuyama Elementary School

== See also ==
- List of railway stations in Japan
