= Kishin Line =

Railway line in Hyogo & Okayama Prefectures, Japan

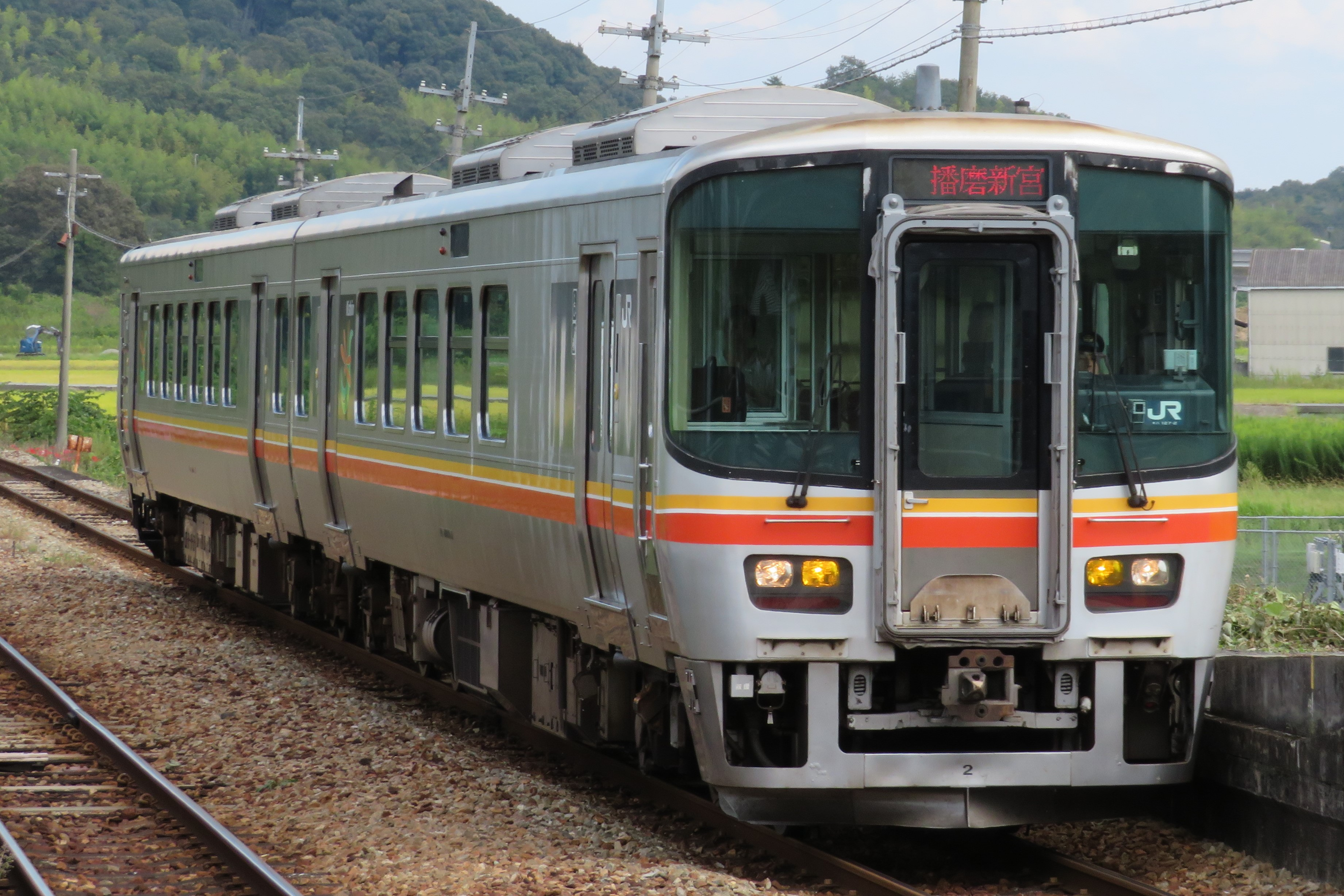
- KiHa 127 series on the Kishin Line

Overview
- Native name: 姫新線
- Status: In operation
- Locale: Hyōgo Prefecture and Okayama Prefecture
- Termini: Himeji; Niimi
- Stations: 36

Service
- Operator: JR West
- Rolling stock: KiHa 40 series DMU, KiHa 120 series DMU, KiHa 122/127 series DMU, DEC700 series DEMU

History
- Opened: 21 August 1923; 103 years ago

Technical
- Line length: 158.1 km (98.2 mi)
- Number of tracks: Single
- Character: Rural
- Track gauge: 1,067 mm (3 ft 6 in)
- Electrification: None
- Operating speed: 100 km/h (62 mph) (Himeji–Kōzuki); 85 km/h (53 mph) (Kōzuki–Niimi)

Kishin Line (姫新線, Kishin-sen) is a railway line operated by West Japan Railway Company (JR West) between Himeji, Hyōgo and Niimi, Okayama, Japan. The name of the line comes from the first kanji of Himeji (姫路) and Niimi (新見) which the line connects.

== Stations ==
- S: Trains stop
- s: Some trains stop
- ｜: Trains pass

Name		Distance (km)	Rapid		Transfers	Location	
Himeji	姫路	0.0			Sanyō Shinkansen; Sanyō Main Line (JR Kobe Line); Bantan Line; Sanyo Railway Main Line (SY 43: Sanyo Himeji)	Himeji	Hyōgo
Harima-Takaoka	播磨高岡	3.8				Himeji	Hyōgo
Yobe	余部	6.1				Himeji	Hyōgo
Ōichi	太市	9.9				Himeji	Hyōgo
Hon-Tatsuno	本竜野	14.9				Tatsuno	Hyōgo
Higashi-Hashisaki	東觜崎	17.8				Tatsuno	Hyōgo
Harima-Shingū	播磨新宮	22.1				Tatsuno	Hyōgo
Sembon	千本	27.6				Tatsuno	Hyōgo
Nishi-Kurisu	西栗栖	31.2				Tatsuno	Hyōgo
Mikazuki	三日月	36.6				Sayō, Sayō District	Hyōgo
Harima-Tokusa	播磨徳久	42.5				Sayō, Sayō District	Hyōgo
Sayo	佐用	45.9	S		Chizu Express Chizu Line	Sayō, Sayō District	Hyōgo
Kōzuki	上月	50.9	S			Sayō, Sayō District	Hyōgo
Mimasaka-Doi	美作土居	57.6	s			Mimasaka	Okayama
Mimasaka-Emi	美作江見	63.0	S			Mimasaka	Okayama
Narahara	楢原	66.4	s			Mimasaka	Okayama
Hayashino	林野	70.4	S			Mimasaka	Okayama
Katsumada	勝間田	74.3	S			Shōō, Katsuta District	Okayama
Nishi-Katsumada	西勝間田	77.3	s			Shōō, Katsuta District	Okayama
Mimasaka-Ōsaki	美作大崎	79.3	s			Tsuyama	Okayama
Higashi-Tsuyama	東津山	83.7	S		Inbi Line	Tsuyama	Okayama
Tsuyama	津山	86.3	S	S	Tsuyama Line	Tsuyama	Okayama
Innoshō	院庄	90.8		s		Tsuyama	Okayama
Mimasaka-Sendai	美作千代	95.6		S		Tsuyama	Okayama
Tsuboi	坪井	98.3		S		Tsuyama	Okayama
Mimasaka-Oiwake	美作追分	103.9		｜		Maniwa	Okayama
Mimasaka-Ochiai	美作落合	110.9		S		Maniwa	Okayama
Komi	古見	114.6		s		Maniwa	Okayama
Kuse	久世	118.9		S		Maniwa	Okayama
Chūgoku-Katsuyama	中国勝山	123.8		S		Maniwa	Okayama
Tsukida	月田	128.6		S		Maniwa	Okayama
Tomihara	富原	134.7		s		Maniwa	Okayama
Osakabe	刑部	141.2		S		Niimi	Okayama
Tajibe	丹治部	145.0		s		Niimi	Okayama
Iwayama	岩山	149.8		s		Niimi	Okayama
Niimi	新見	158.1		S	Hakubi Line; Geibi Line	Niimi	Okayama

== Rolling stock ==
New KiHa 122 and KiHa 127 series diesel multiple units (DMUs) were introduced on the line between Himeji and Kōzuki from spring 2009. Journey times were reduced from spring 2010 after the entire fleet of new trains had been delivered.

== History ==
The first section of the line opened was from Tsuyama to the north in 1923, and the line was progressively extended until it reached Niimi in 1929. The section from Himeji opened in stages from 1930, and the line was completed in 1936.

CTC signalling was commissioned in 1986, and freight services ceased the following year.

=== Former connecting lines ===
- Harima-Shingu Station: The Tatsuno Electric Railway Co. opened a 17 km 1,435 mm gauge line electrified at 600 V DC from Shingu-Cho to Aboshiko between 1909 and 1915 which connected at this station, as well as the Sanyo Main Line at Aboshi. The line closed in 1934.
