= Kōzuki Station =

Railway station in Sayō, Hyōgo Prefecture, Japan

Kōzuki Station 上月駅
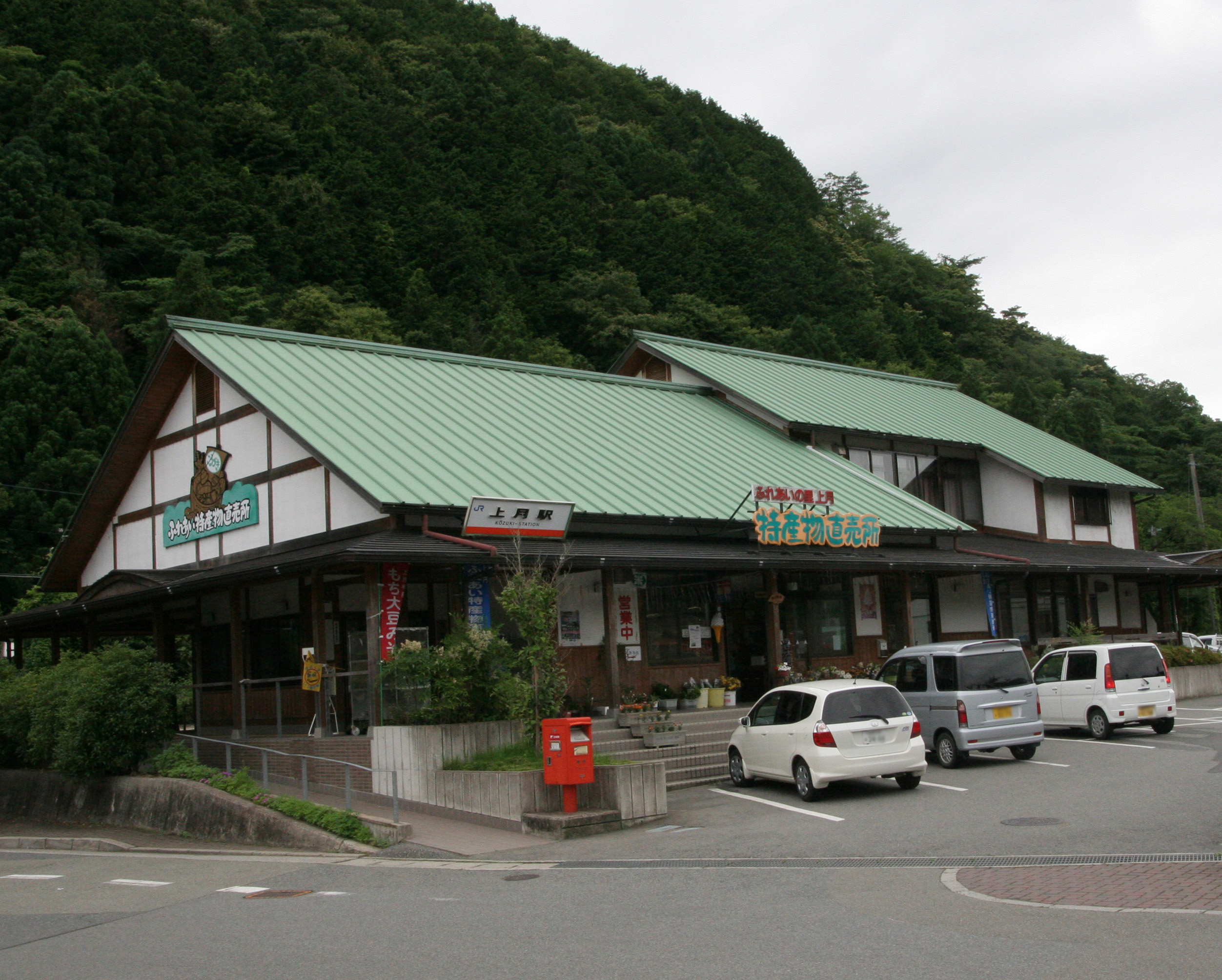
- Kōzuki Station, June 2008

General information
- Location: 513 Kōzuki, Sayō-chō, Sayō-gun, Hyōgo-ken 679-5523; Japan
- Coordinates: 34.9833°N 134.3225°E
- Owner: West Japan Railway Company
- Operator: West Japan Railway Company
- Line: Kishin Line
- Distance: 50.9 km (31.6 miles) from Himeji
- Platforms: 2 side platforms
- Connections: Bus stop

Other information
- Status: Unstaffed
- Website: Official website

History
- Opened: 8 April 1936; 90 years ago

Passengers
- FY2019: 37 daily
Location
- Location within Hyōgo Prefecture Location within Japan

Kōzuki Station (上月駅, Kōzuki-eki) is a passenger railway station located in the town of Sayō, Sayō District, Hyōgo Prefecture, Japan, operated by West Japan Railway Company (JR West).

== Lines ==
Kōzuki Station is served by the Kishin Line, and is located 50.9 kilometers from the terminus of the line at Himeji.

== Station layout ==
The station consists of two opposed side platforms connected to the station building by a footbridge. The station is unattended, but has a local products store and noodle shop.

=== Platforms ===
1	■ Kishin Line	for Tsuyama and Niimi
2	■ Kishin Line	for Sayo, Himeji

== Adjacent stations ==
«	Service	»
Kishin Line
Sayo	Rapid	Mimasaka-Doi
Sayo	Local	Mimasaka-Doi

== History ==
Kōzuki Station opened on April 8, 1938. With the privatization of the Japan National Railways (JNR) on April 1, 1987, the station came under the aegis of the West Japan Railway Company.

== Passenger statistics ==
In fiscal 2019, the station was used by an average of 37 passengers daily.

== Surrounding area ==
- Sayō Town Hall Kōzuki Branch
- Sayō Municipal Kōzuki Junior High School
- Sayō Municipal Kōzuki Elementary School
- Kōzuki Castle Ruins

== See also ==
- List of railway stations in Japan
