= Mimasaka-Ōsaki Station =

Railway station in Tsuyama, Okayama Prefecture, Japan

Mimasaka-Ōsaki Station 美作大崎駅
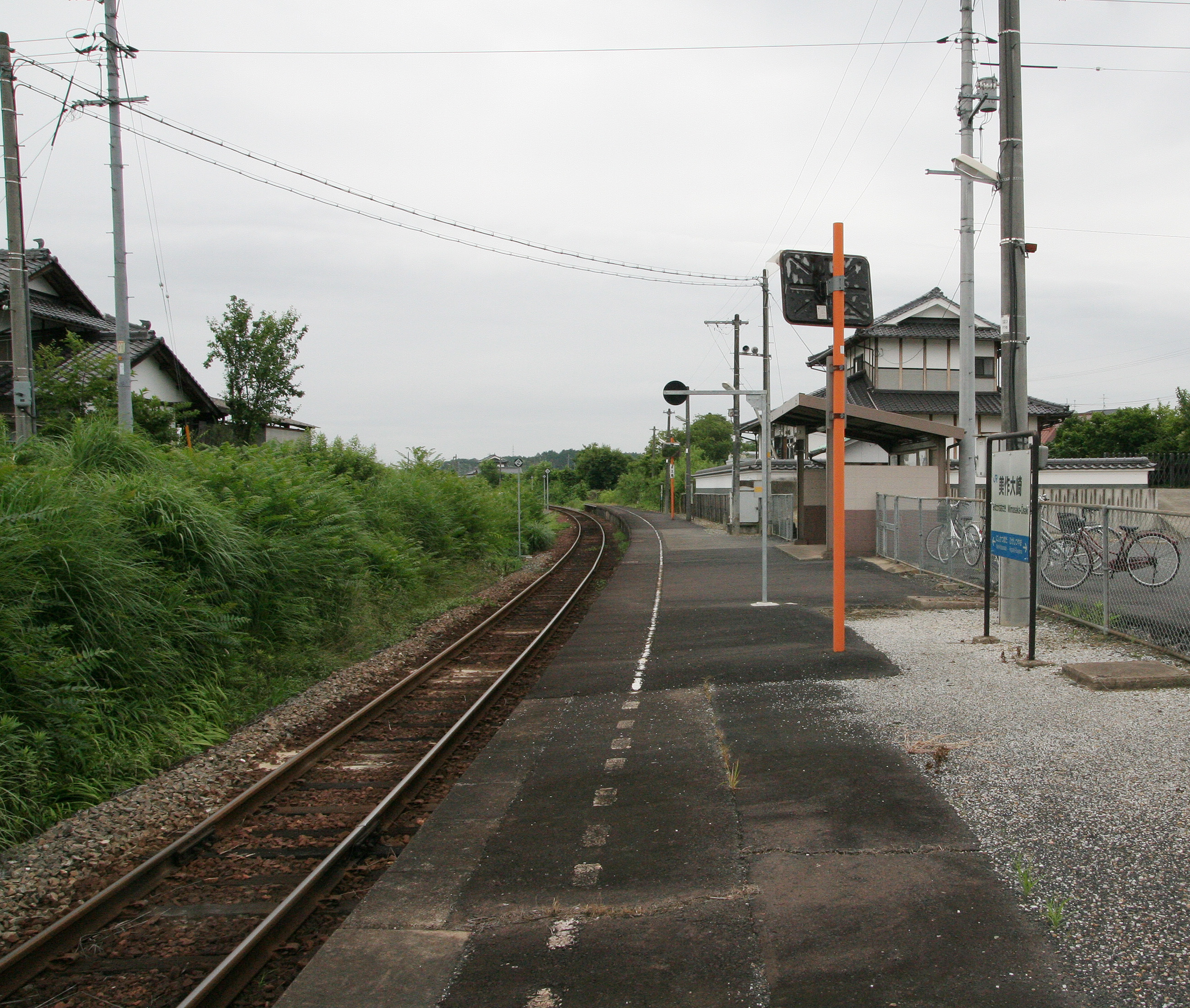
- Mimasaka-Ōsaki Station

General information
- Location: Fukuriki, Tsuyama-shi, Okayama-ken 708-0857; Japan
- Coordinates: 35°2′43.13″N 134°4′2.93″E
- Owner: West Japan Railway Company
- Operator: West Japan Railway Company
- Line: K Kishin Line
- Distance: 79.3 km (49.3 miles) from Himeji
- Platforms: 1 side platform
- Connections: Bus stop

Other information
- Status: Unstaffed
- Website: Official website

History
- Opened: 28 November 1934; 91 years ago

Passengers
- FY2019: 22 daily
Location
- Location within Okayama Prefecture Location within Japan

Mimasaka-Ōsaki Station (美作大崎駅, Mimasaka-Ōsaki-eki) is a passenger railway station located in the city of Tsuyama, Okayama Prefecture, Japan, operated by West Japan Railway Company (JR West).

== Lines ==
Mimasaka-Ōsaki Station is served by the Kishin Line, and is located 79.3 kilometers from the southern terminus of the line at Himeji.

== Station layout ==
The station consists of one ground-level side platform serving a single bi-directional track. There is no station building and the station is unattended.

== Adjacent stations ==
«	Service	»
JR West Kishin Line
Rapid: Does not stop at this station
Nishi-Katsumada	Local	Higashi-Tsuyama

== History ==
Mimasaka-Ōsaki Station opened on November 28, 1934. With the privatization of the Japan National Railways (JNR) on April 1, 1987, the station came under the aegis of the West Japan Railway Company.

== Passenger statistics ==
In fiscal 2019, the station was used by an average of 22 passengers daily.

== Surrounding area ==
- Tsuyama Municipal Osaki Elementary School
- Japan National Route 181

== See also ==
- List of railway stations in Japan
