= Narahara Station =

Railway station in Mimasaka, Okayama Prefecture, Japan

Narahara Station 楢原駅
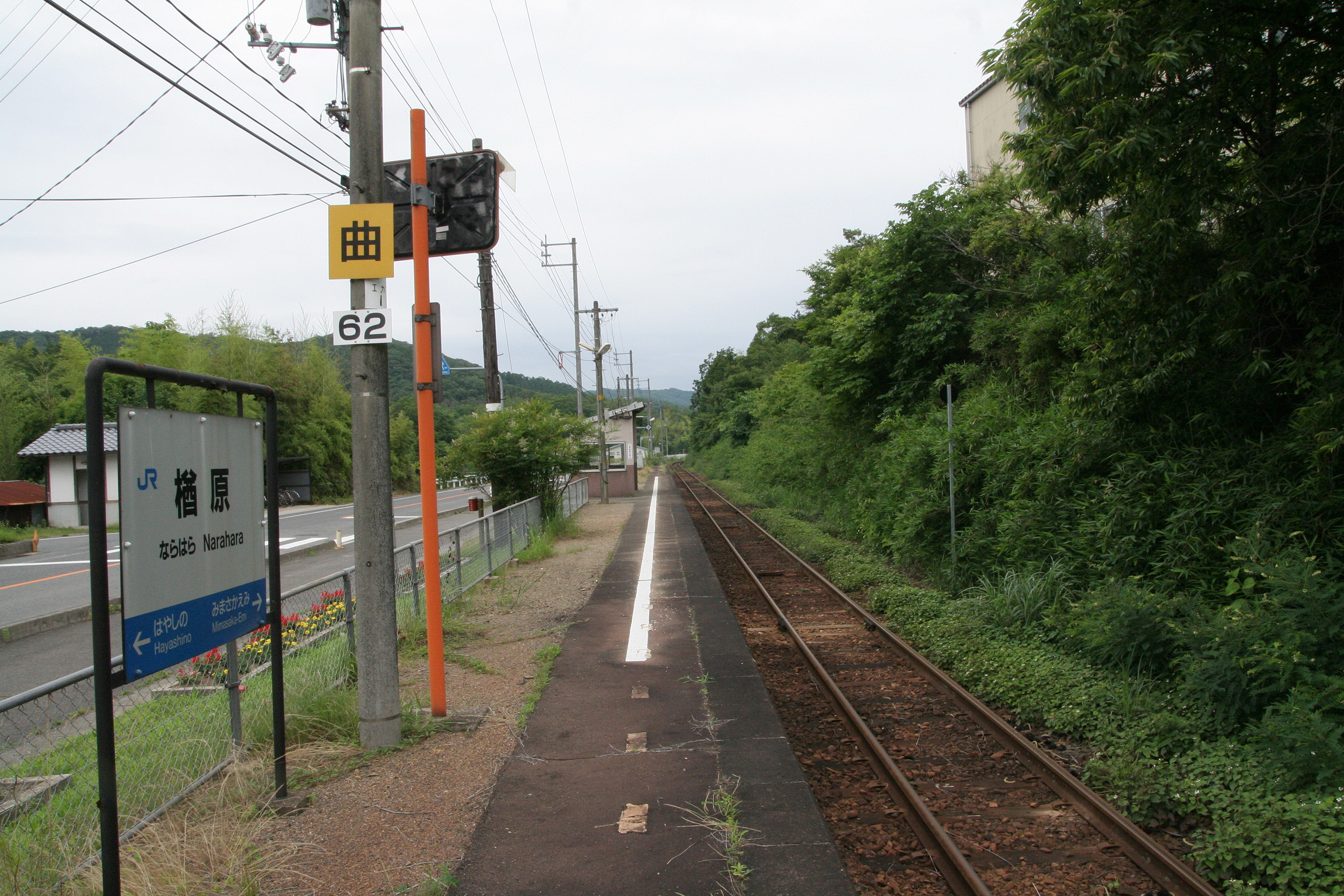
- Narahara Station platform, June 2008

General information
- Location: Naraharakami, Mimasaka-shi, Okayama-ken 707-0022; Japan
- Coordinates: 35°1′11.01″N 134°11′21.83″E
- Owner: West Japan Railway Company
- Operator: West Japan Railway Company
- Line: Kishin Line
- Distance: 66.4 km (41.3 miles) from Himeji
- Platforms: 1 side platform
- Tracks: 1
- Connections: Bus stop

Other information
- Status: Unstaffed
- Website: Official website

History
- Opened: 28 November 1934; 91 years ago

Passengers
- FY2019: 54 daily
Location
- Location within Okayama Prefecture Location within Japan

Narahara Station (楢原駅, Narahara-ek-eki) is a passenger railway station located in the city of Mimasaka, Okayama Prefecture, Japan, operated by West Japan Railway Company (JR West).

== Lines ==
Narahara Station is served by the Kishin Line, and is located 66.4 kilometers from the southern terminus of the line at Himeji.

== Station layout ==
The station consists of one ground-level side platform serving a single bi-directional track. There is no station building and the station is unattended.

== Adjacent stations ==
«	Service	»
JR West Kishin Line
Rapid: Does not stop at this station
Mimasaka-Emi	Local	Hayashino

== History ==
Narahara Station opened on October 1, 1954. With the privatization of the Japan National Railways (JNR) on April 1, 1987, the station came under the aegis of the West Japan Railway Company. A new station building was completed in February 2021.

== Passenger statistics ==
In fiscal 2019, the station was used by an average of 25 passengers daily.

== Surrounding area ==
- Yamazaki Industry Okayama Factory
- Chugoku Expressway Narahara Parking Area

== See also ==
- List of railway stations in Japan
