= DEC700 =

Diesel-electric multiple unit train operated by JR West

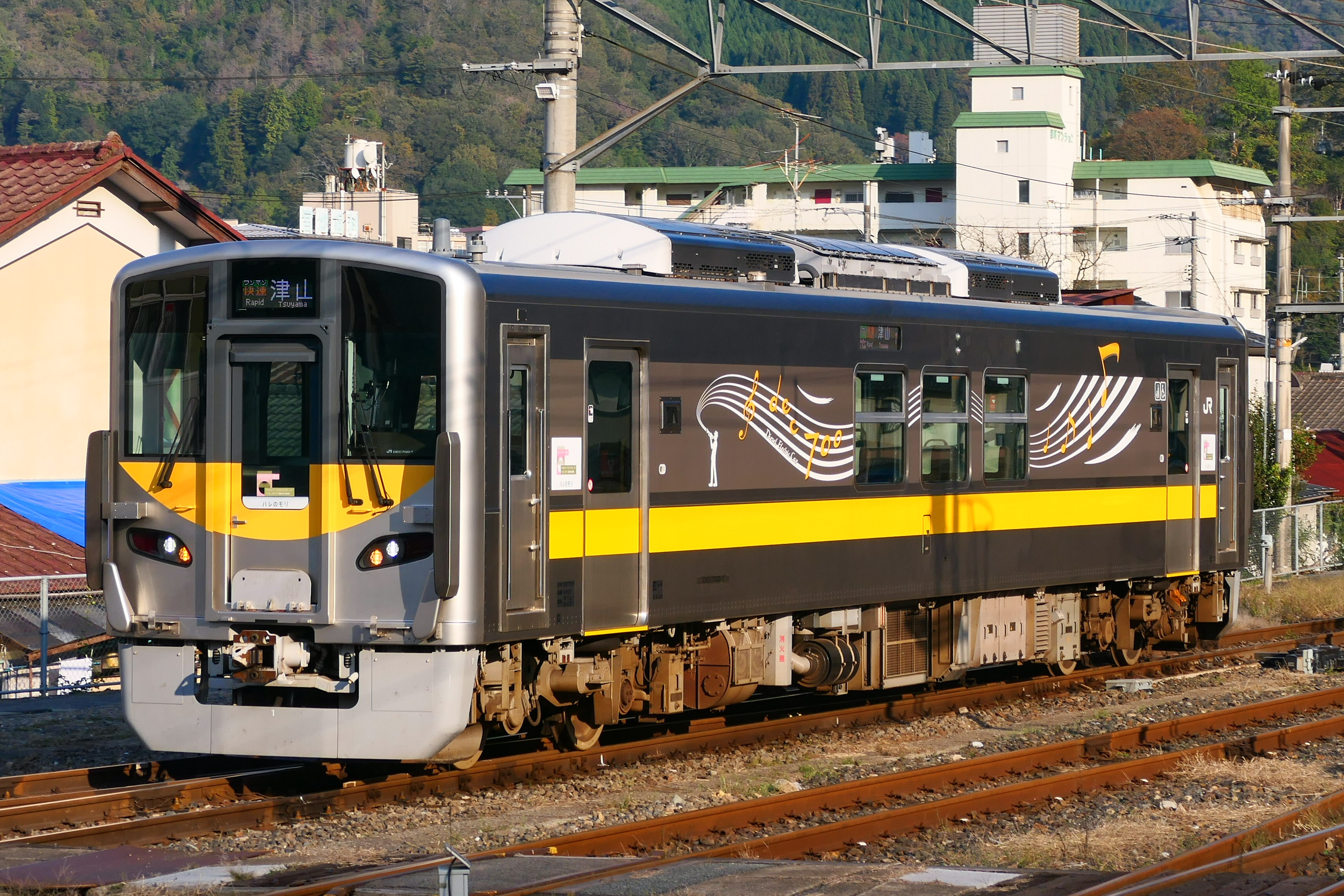
- The sole DEC700 at Niimi Station, November 2024.
- Stock type: Diesel-electric multiple unit
- In service: 28 September 2024 - Present
- Manufacturer: Kawasaki Heavy Industries
- Family name: efACE
- Constructed: 2021
- Entered service: 28 September 2024
- Number built: 1
- Number in service: 1
- Formation: Single unit
- Operator: JR West

Specifications
- Car body construction: Stainless Steel
- Car length: 20,000 mm (66 ft)
- Width: 2,800 mm (9.2 ft)
- Maximum speed: 100 km/h (62 mph)
- Acceleration: 2.1kmh/s
- Deceleration: 3.9kmh/s
- AAR wheel arrangement: B-B
- Track gauge: 1,067 mm (3 ft 6 in)

The DEC700 is a low capacity diesel-electric multiple unit operated by JR West, being part of the efACE family. The sole unit, DEC700-1, was built by Kawasaki Heavy Industries, and has been in service since September 28, 2024.

The body of the DMU was based on the 225 and 227 series EMUs also operated by JR West. DEC in the name of the unit means Diesel-Electric Car, and is also matched with the correspondence to the positions of D, E and C on the Chromatic scale.

The sole unit passing the bridge over the Koya River between Habu and Ozuki during a test run on the Sanyō line. - Taken August 2021

== Background and design ==
Based on JR West's vision of "creating a sustainable railway and transportation system", this railcar was built to assess in improving maintenance efficiency, safety, and reduce manufacturing costs through system integration of electric and diesel railcars, reduction of mechanical parts, and modular construction.

The DEC700 was designed to be capable of switching to a hybrid system by using additional secondary batteries during technical verification.

== Operational history ==
The railcar was unveiled to the press at the Shimonoseki General Rolling Stock Center on August 11, 2021, and performance tests were conducted on August 16. From September 2021, full-scale trials were conducted on lines within the Yamaguchi Prefecture. Tests were also conducted not only in the jurisdiction of Hiroshima Branch but also in both Yonago and Kyoto areas. Hybrid tests were conducted from 2022.

Separately, as part of efforts to achieve carbon neutrality, demonstration experiments were conducted between 2022 and 2024 to introduce "next-generation biodiesel fuel", expected to have the same quality as diesel with the experiments conducted using the model and the KiHa 40 series.

The railcar was placed into service on the "Hare no Mori" rapid service on the Kishin Line between Tsuyama and Niimi on weekends and holidays from September 28 to November 24, 2024.
