= Sayo Station =

Railway station in Sayō, Hyōgo Prefecture, Japan

Sayo Station 佐用駅
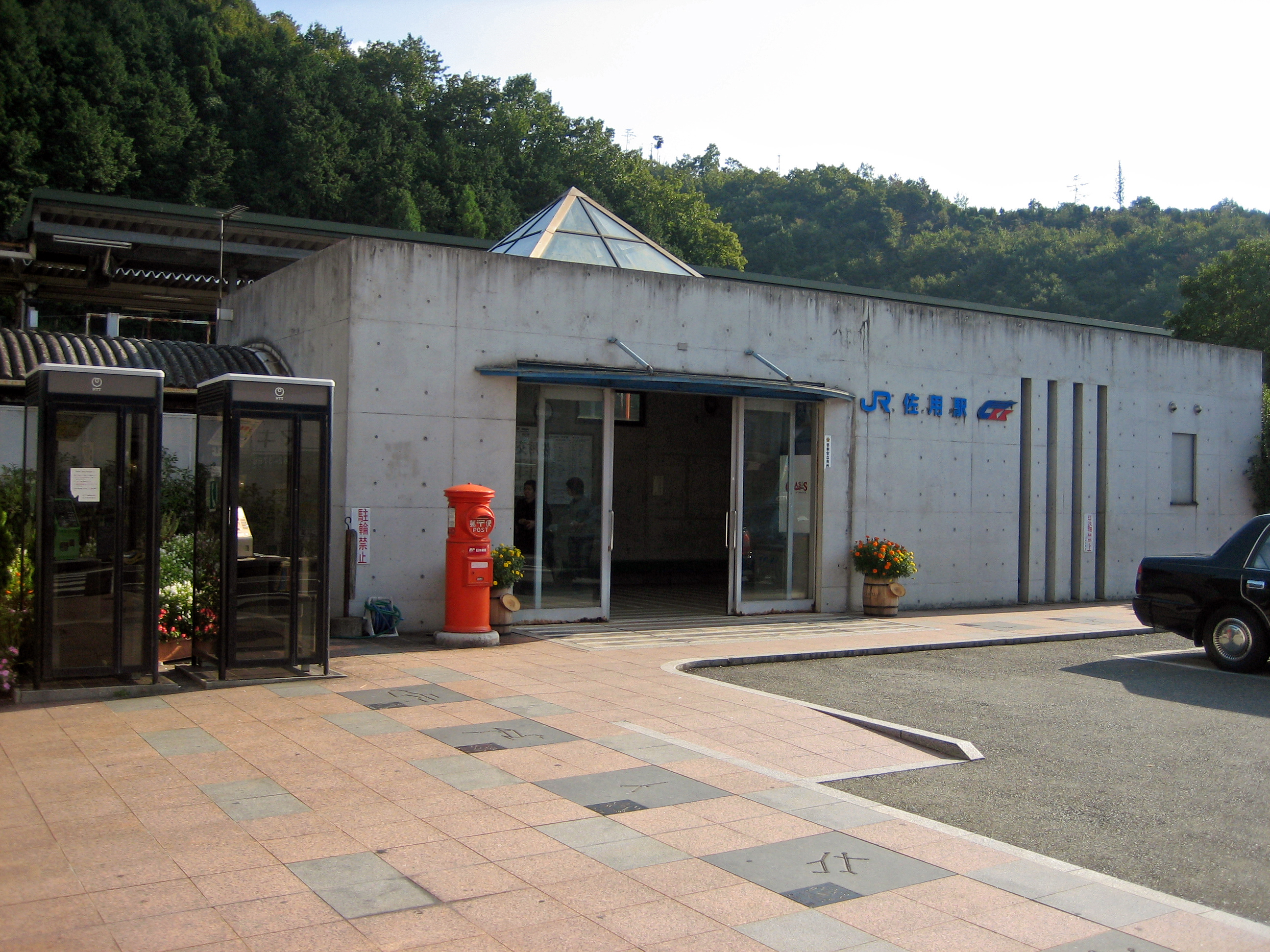
- Sayo Station, October 2008

General information
- Location: 382-3 Sayō, Sayō-chō, Sayō-gun, Hyōgo-ken 679-5301; Japan
- Coordinates: 35.0038°N 134.3568°E
- Operator: West Japan Railway Company; Chizu Express
- Lines: Kishin Line; ■ Chizu Express Chizu Line
- Distance: 45.9 km (28.5 miles) from Himeji
- Platforms: 2 island platforms

Other information
- Status: Staffed (Midori no Madoguchi )

History
- Opened: 30 July 1935; 91 years ago

Passengers
- FY2019: 450 daily
Location
- Location within Hyōgo Prefecture Location within Japan

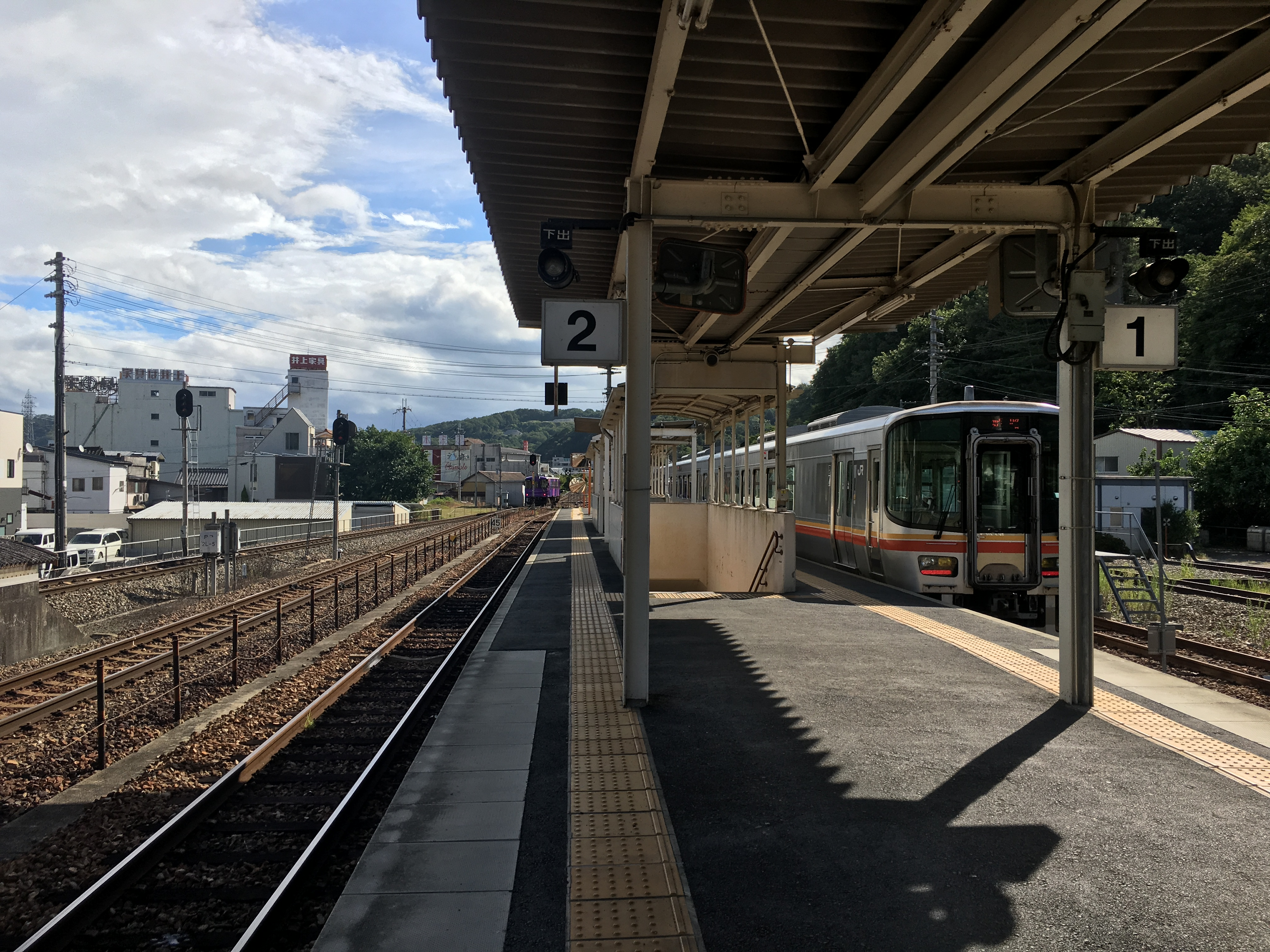
Station platforms and train, 2019

Sayo Station (佐用駅, Sayo-eki) is a junction passenger railway station located in the town of Sayō, Hyōgo Prefecture, Japan, jointly operated by West Japan Railway Company (JR West) and the third-sector railway operator Chizu Express.

== Lines ==
Sayo Station is served by the JR West Kishin Line and is 45.9 kilometers from the terminus of the line at Himeji. It is also served by the Chizu Express Chizu Line, and is 17.2 kilometers from the terminus of that line at Kamigōri.

== Station layout ==
The station consists of two island platforms connected by an underground passage. The station has a Midori no Madoguchi staffed ticket office.

=== Platforms ===
1	■ Kishin Line	for Tsuyama
2	■ Kishin Line	for Himeji
3	■ Chizu Line	for Chizu, Tottori and Kurayoshi
4	■ Chizu Line	for Kamigori, Osaka, Kyoto and Okayama

== Adjacent stations ==
«	Service	»
Kishin Line
Harima-Tokusa	Local	Kōzuki
Chizu Express Chizu Line
Kuzaki	Local	Hirafuku
Kamigori	Limited Express Super Hakuto	Ohara
Kamigori	Limited Express Super Inaba	Ohara

== History ==
Sayo Station opened on 30 July 1935.

== Passenger statistics ==
In fiscal 2019, the station was used by an average of 450 passengers daily.

== Surrounding area ==
- Sayo Town Hall
- Hyogo Prefectural Sayo High School
- Sayo Municipal Sayo Elementary School

== See also ==
- List of railway stations in Japan
