= Himeji Station =

Railway station in Himeji, Hyōgo Prefecture, Japan

A 85 Himeji Station 姫路駅
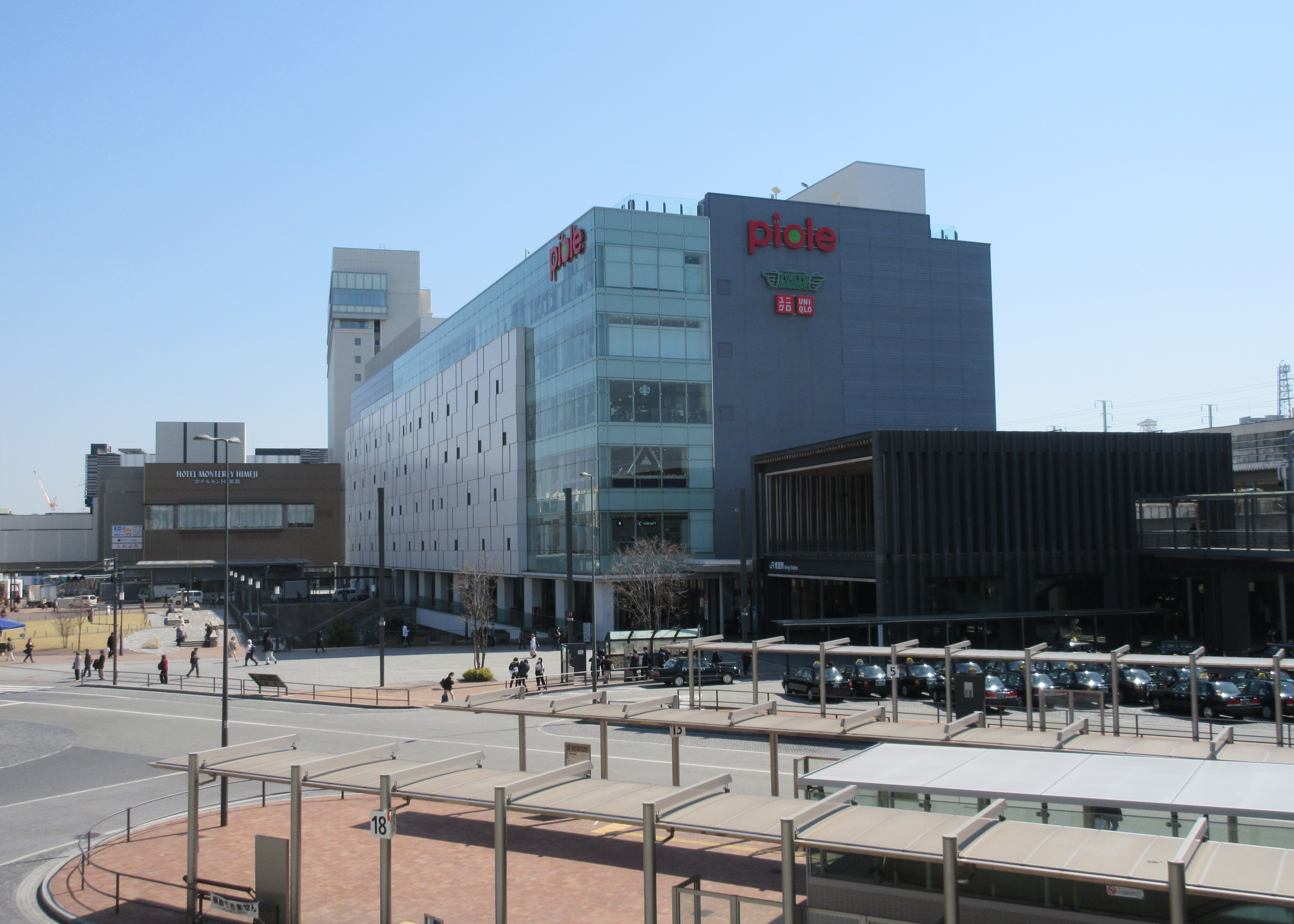
- North station complex and bus terminal at Himeji Station

General information
- Location: 188 Ekimaecho, Himeji-shi, Hyōgo-ken 670-0927; Japan
- Coordinates: 34°49′39.5″N 134°41′27.06″E
- Operator: JR West
- Lines: San'yō Shinkansen; A San'yō Main Line (JR Kobe Line); J Bantan Line; K Kishin Line
- Platforms: 5 island + 1 side platform
- Connections: Sanyo Electric Railway Main Line (at Sanyo Himeji)

Construction
- Structure type: Elevated
- Accessible: Yes

Other information
- Status: Staffed
- Station code: JR-A85 (JR Kobe Line)
- Website: Official website

History
- Opened: 23 December 1888; 137 years ago

Passengers
- FY2019: 51,763 daily

Services
| Preceding station | JR West | Following station |
|---|---|---|
| Okayama towards Hakata | San'yō Shinkansen Mizuho | Shin-Kobe towards Shin-Ōsaka |
| Okayama towards Hakata | San'yō Shinkansen Sakura | Shin-Kobe towards Shin-Ōsaka |
| Okayama towards Hakata | San'yō Shinkansen Nozomi | Nishi-Akashi towards Shin-Ōsaka |
| Okayama towards Hakata | San'yō Shinkansen Hikari | Nishi-Akashi towards Shin-Ōsaka |
| Aioi towards Hakata or Hakataminami | San'yō Shinkansen Kodama | Nishi-Akashi towards Shin-Ōsaka |
Location
- Location within Hyōgo Prefecture Location within Japan

Himeji Station (姫路駅, Himeji-eki) is a major interchange railway station located in the city of Himeji, Japan, operated by West Japan Railway Company (JR West). Himeji is a major stop on the San'yō Main Line and the Sanyō Shinkansen, and the western end of the JR Kobe Line. The station building is located close to the Sanyo Electric Railway Himeji Station and Himeji Castle.

== Lines ==
Himeji Station is served by the JR San'yō Main Line, and is located 54.8 kilometers from the terminus of the line at Kobe and 87.9 kilometers from Osaka. On the Shinkansen network it is 91.7 kilometers from Shin-Osaka and 644.3 kilometers from Tokyo. The 65.7 kilometer Bantan Line to Wadayama and the 158.1 kilometer Kishin Line to Niimi terminate at Himeji Station.

== Station layout ==
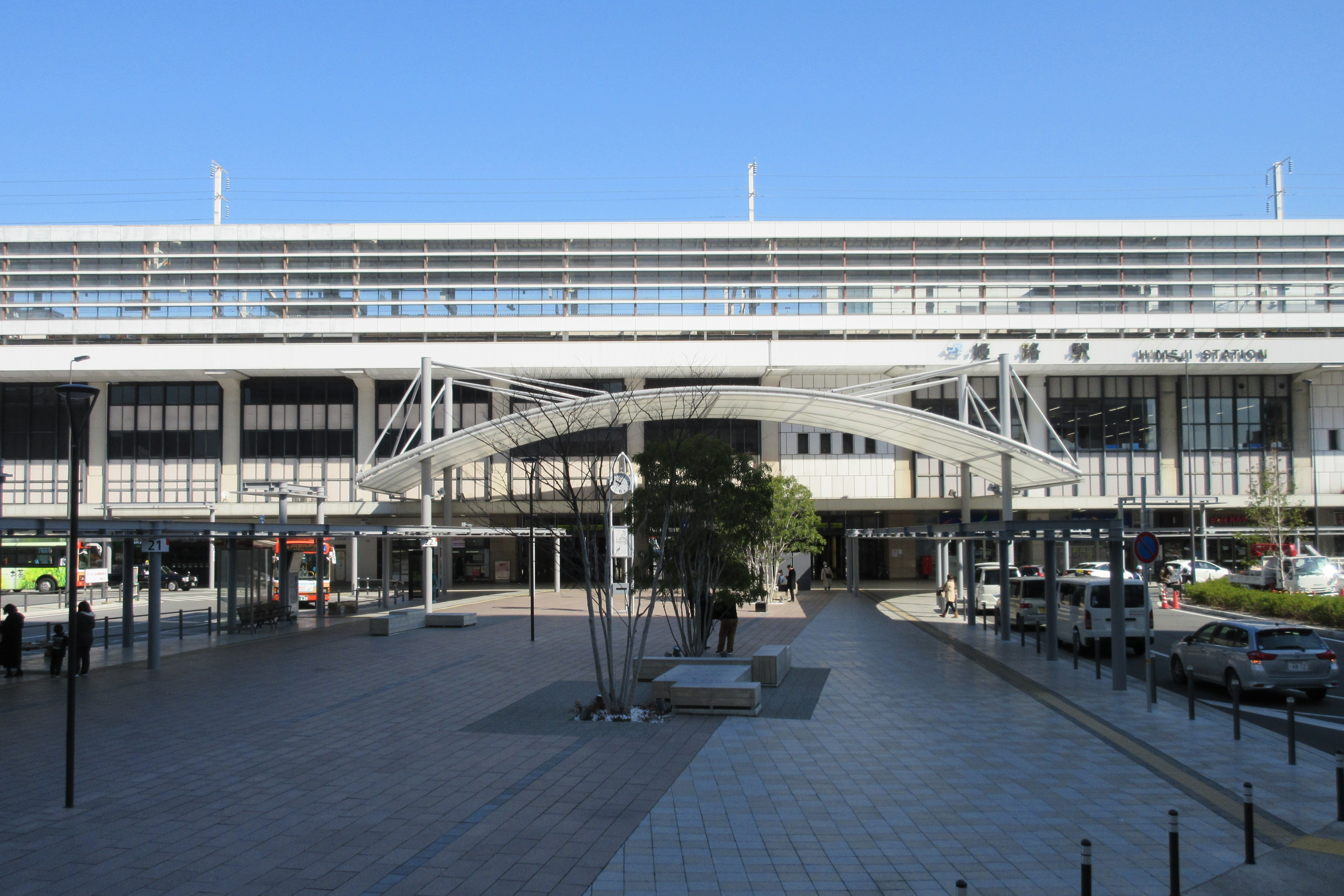
South entrance of Himeji Station

The station has a complex layout of elevated platforms. The conventional trains operate from four island platforms, the first two of which have one dead-headed track each. The Shinkansen portion of the station has one side platform and one island platform with two passing tracks between them.

=== Platforms ===
| 1 | ■ Bantan Line | for Teramae and Wadayama |
| 2 | ■ Limited Express Hamakaze | for Osaka |
| 3, 4 | ■ Kishin Line | for Sayo |
| 5, 6 | ■ San'yō Main Line | for Sannomiya and Osaka |
| 5 | ■ Limited Express Super Hakuto | for Kyoto |
| 7, 8 | ■ San'yō Main Line | for Aioi, Banshū-Akō and Kamigōri |
| 7 | ■ Limited Express Hamakaze | for Kinosaki Onsen |
| 7, 8 | ■ Limited Express Super Hakuto | for Tottori Kurayoshi |
| 11 | ■ San'yō Shinkansen | for Shin-Osaka and Tokyo |
| 12,13 | ■ San'yō Shinkansen | for Okayama, Hakata and Kagoshima-Chūō |

== Adjacent stations ==
| « | Service | » |
San'yō Main Line (JR Kobe Line)
| Hamamatsu CA34 (westbound); Sannomiya (JR-A61) (eastbound) | Sleeper Limited Express; Sunrise Seto & Sunrise Izumo | Okayama |
| Nishi-Akashi (JR-A74) (One-way Operation) | West Express Ginga (San'in Route) | Shoyama |
| Nishi-Akashi (JR-A74) | West Express Ginga (San'yo Route) | Okayama (JR-S01) (JR-W01) |
| Akashi (JR-A73); Kakogawa (JR-A79) (No. 13 only) | Limited Express; Super Hakuto | Aioi or Kamigori |
| Kakogawa (JR-A79) | Commuter Limited Express; Rakuraku Harima | Terminus |
| Kakogawa (JR-A79) | Special Rapid Service | Tegarayamaheiwakōen |
| Higashi-Himeji (JR-A84) | Local (Rapid Service) | Tegarayamaheiwakōen |
Bantan Line
| Akashi (JR-A73); Kakogawa (JR-A79) (No. 5 only) | Limited Express; Hamakaze | Fukusaki |
| Terminus | Local | Kyoguchi |
Kishin Line
| Terminus | Local | Harima-Takaoka |

== History ==
Himeji Station was opened by Sanyo Railway, the present-day San'yō Main Line, in 1888. At the time, railway stations were usually built either outside or alongside urban areas, but Himeji Station was built bordering the old city walls, at the end of the main street (Ootemae-dori). The current Sanyo Railway Station is actually constructed on top of part of the old city wall. It is thought that the reason was that the army was based in Himeji Castle. This proximity to the city helped to contribute to urban development.

Himeji Station was linked to Bantan Railway (播但鉄道, Bantan Tetsudō), the present day Bantan Line, in 1894. Kishin Line was linked to the station in 1930.

The station was expanded with the opening of the Sanyo Shinkansen in 1972.

Preparation for the elevation of the conventional lines had been undertaken since 1989, and begun in earnest in 1994 after the relocation of Himeji's freight terminal and train yards. On March 26, 2006, platforms for the JR Kobe Line and Sanyo Main Line switched to the elevated railway. Platforms for the Bantan and Kishin Lines were elevated beginning on December 22, 2008.

=== Timeline ===
- December 23, 1888: The Sanyo Railway segment between Akashi Station and Himeji Station opens.
- July 26, 1894: The Bantan Railway segment between Himeji Station and Teramae Station opens.
- June 1, 1903: Sanyo Railway purchases Bantan Railway.
- December 1, 1906: Sanyo Railway is nationalized.
- September 1, 1930: Kishin Line is connected.
- March 15, 1972: The Sanyo Shinkansen segment between Okayama and Shin-Osaka opens.
- April 1, 1987: Japanese National Railways is divided and privatized. The line is taken over by the West Japan Railway Company.
- January 17, 1995: There was a blockage of the segment of the Sanyō Shinkansen between Shin-Osaka and Himeji, caused by the Great Hanshin earthquake.
- April 8, 1995: The blocked section reopens.
- October 1, 2003: Nozomi service is added to the schedule.
- March 15, 2014: Mizuho service is added to the schedule.
- March 2018: Introduction of station numbering to the Kobe Line as Himeji was assigned station number JR-A85.

== Passenger statistics ==
In fiscal 2016, the station was used by an average of 51,763 passengers daily (boarding passengers only).

== See also ==
- List of railway stations in Japan
