= Miyamoto-Musashi Station =

Railway station in Mimasaka, Okayama Prefecture, Japan

Miyamoto Musashi Station 宮本武蔵駅
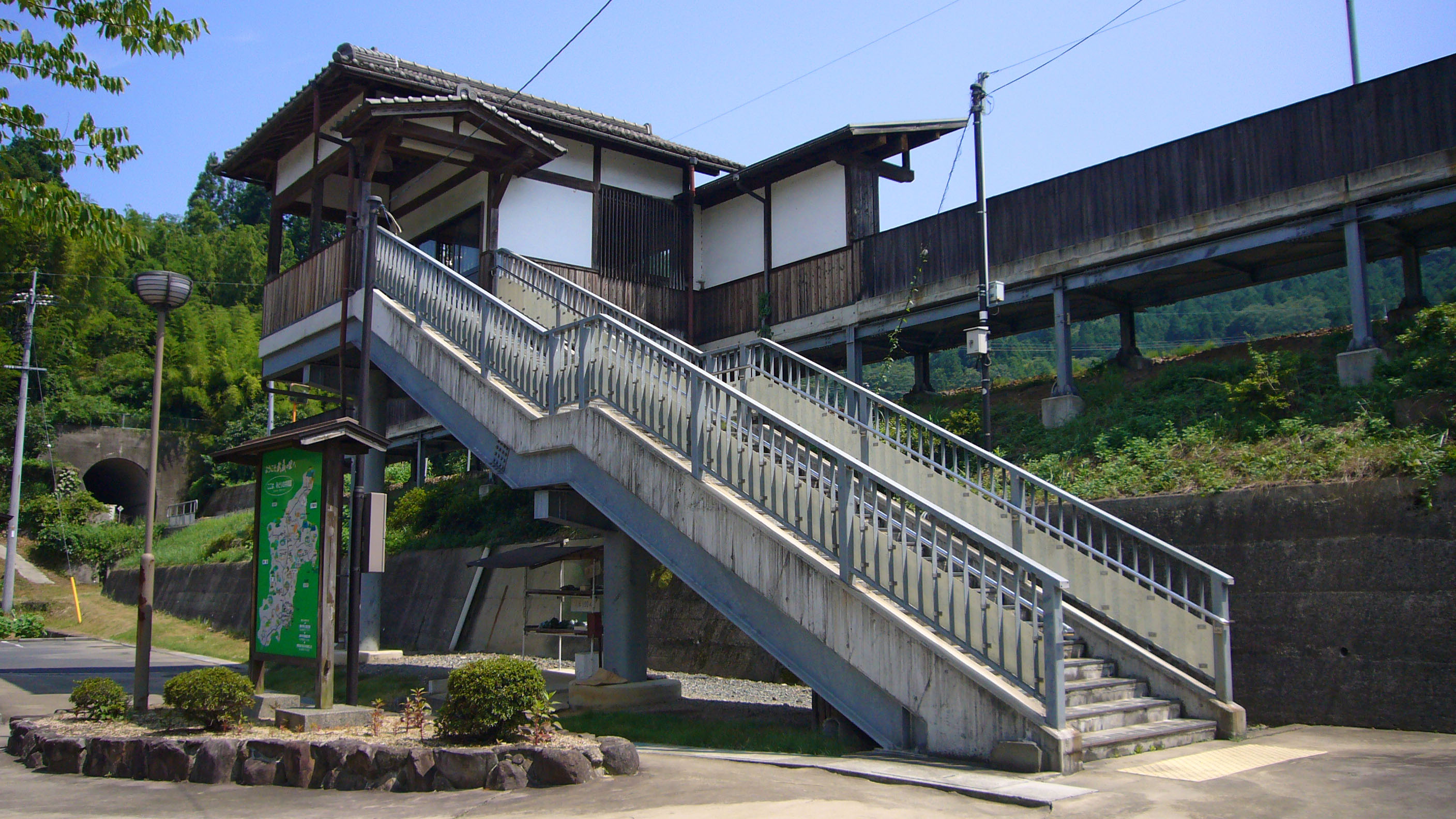
- Miyamoto Musashi Station in August 2006

General information
- Location: 384-5 Imaoka, Mimasaka-shi, Okayama-ken 707-0416; Japan
- Coordinates: 35°6′6″N 134°19′49.5″E
- Operator: Chizu Express
- Line: ■ Chizu Express Chizu Line
- Distance: 30.6 km (19.0 miles) from Kamigōri
- Platforms: 1 side platform
- Connections: Bus stop

Other information
- Status: Unstaffed
- Website: Official website

History
- Opened: 3 December 1994

Passengers
- FY2018: 10 daily
Location
- Location within Okayama Prefecture Location within Japan

Miyamoto Musashi Station (宮本武蔵駅, Miyamoto-Musashi-eki) is a passenger railway station located in the city of Mimasaka, Okayama Prefecture, Japan. It is operated by the third-sector semi-public railway operator Chizu Express. The station takes its name from the famous warrior Miyamoto Musashi, who (according to one theory) was born nearby.

== Lines ==
Miyamoto Musashi Station is served by the Chizu Line and is 30.6 kilometers from the terminus of the line at Kamigōri.

== Station layout ==
The station consists of a single side platform located on an embankment serving a single bi-directional track. The platform is on the left side of the track when facing in the direction of Chizu, and is connected to a small station building by stairs. The station is unattended.

== Adjacent stations ==
«	Service	»
Chizu Express Chizu Line
Limited Express "Super Inaba": Does not stop at this station
Limited Express "Super Hakuto": Does not stop at this station
Ishii	Local	Ōhara

== History ==
Miyamoto Musashi Station opened on December 3, 1994 with the opening of the Chizu Line.

== Passenger statistics ==
In fiscal 2018, the station was used by an average of 10 passengers daily.

== Surrounding area ==
- Miyamoto Musashi Budokan
- Mimasaka City Ōhara Elementary School
- Mimasaka City Ōhara Middle School
- Miyamoto Musashi Archives
- National Route 373
- National Route 429
- Okayama Prefectural Route 5
- Okayama Prefectural Route / Hyōgo Prefectural Route 240

== See also ==
- List of railway stations in Japan
