= Nishi-Awakura Station =

Railway station in Nishiawakura, Okayama Prefecture, Japan

Nishi-Awakura Station 西粟倉駅
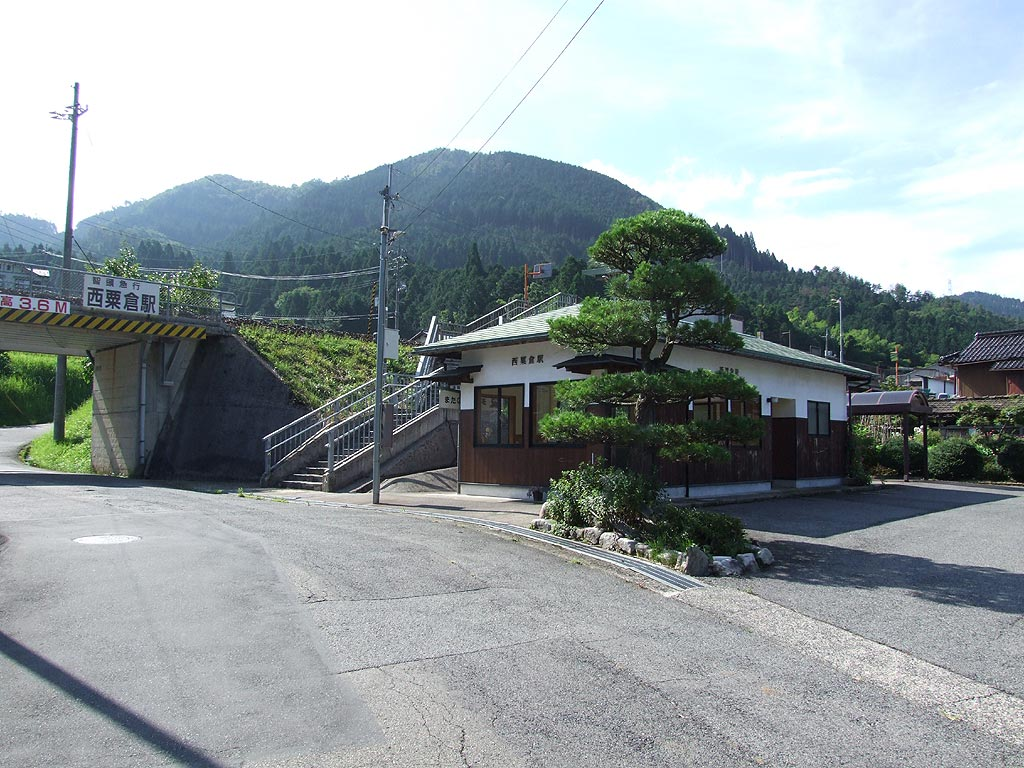
- Nishi-Awakura Station in August 2008

General information
- Location: 794-3 Nagao, Nishiawakura-son, Aida-gun, Okayama-ken 707-0504; Japan
- Coordinates: 35°9′39.7″N 134°20′9″E
- Operator: Chizu Express
- Line: ■ Chizu Express Chizu Line
- Distance: 37.4 km (23.2 miles) from Kamigōri
- Platforms: 1 side platform
- Tracks: 1

Other information
- Status: Unstaffed
- Website: Official website

History
- Opened: 3 December 1994

Passengers
- 2018: 5 daily
Location
- Location within Okayama Prefecture Location within Japan

Nishi-Awakura Station (西粟倉駅, Nishi-Awakura-eki) is a passenger railway station located in the village of Nishiawakura, Aida District, Okayama Prefecture, Japan. It is operated by the third-sector semi-public railway operator Chizu Express.

== Lines ==
Nishi-Awakura Station is served by the Chizu Express Chizu Line and is 37.4 kilometers from the terminus of the line at Kamigōri

== Station layout ==
The station consists of one side platform located on an embankment. The platform the left side of the tracks when facing in the direction of Chizu. There is no station building, but there is a hut-like waiting area on the platform. The station is unattended.

== Adjacent stations ==
«	Service	»
Chizu Express
Chizu Line
Limited Express "Super Inaba": Does not stop at this station
Limited Express "Super Hakuto": Does not stop at this station
Ōhara	Local	Awakura-Onsen

== History ==
Nishi-Awakura Station opened on December 3, 1994 with the opening of the Chizu Line.

== Passenger statistics ==
In fiscal 2018, the station was used by an average of 5 passengers daily.

== Surrounding area ==
- Nishiawakura Village Office
- Nishiawakura Village Nishiawakura Junior High School
- Nishiawakura Village Nishiawakura Elementary School

== See also ==
- List of railway stations in Japan
