= Awakura-Onsen Station =

Railway station in Nishiawakura, Okayama Prefecture, Japan

Awakura-Onsen Station あわくら温泉駅
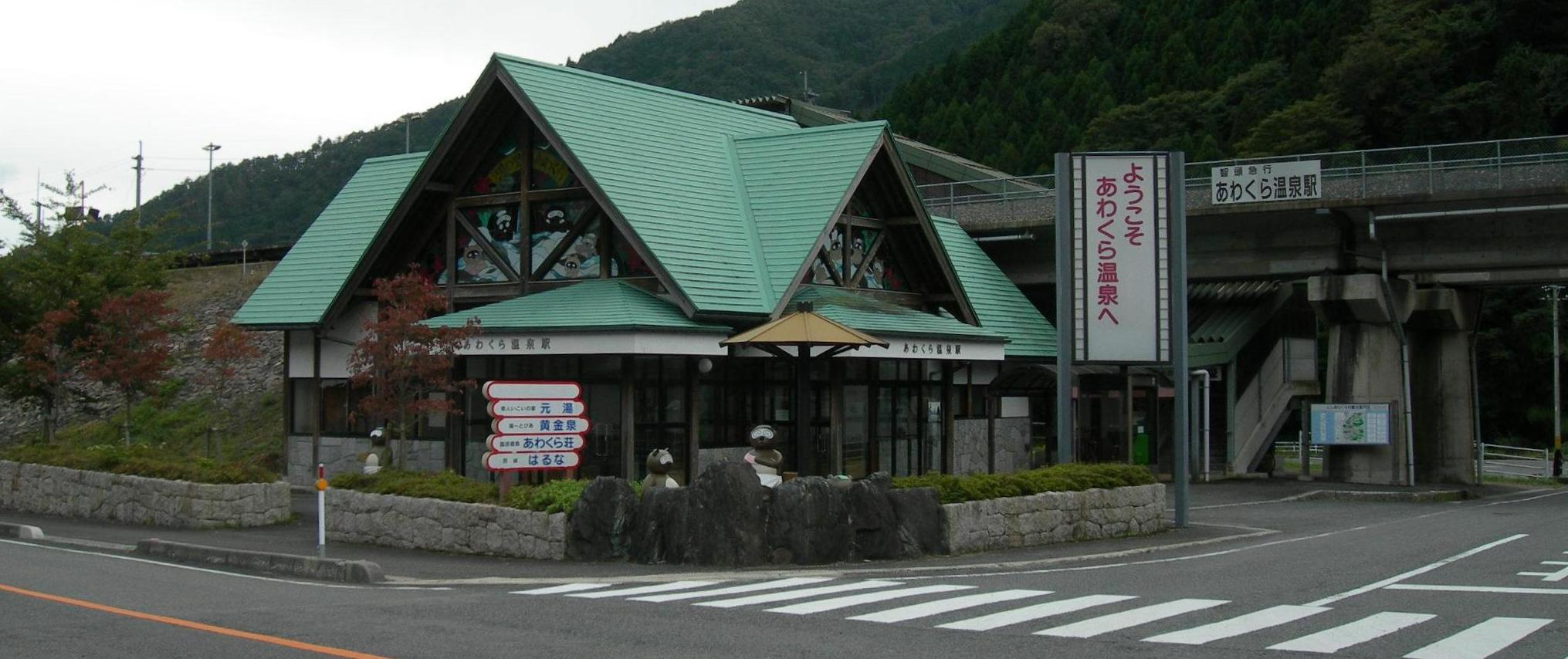
- Awakura-Onsen Station in October 2007

General information
- Location: 612-4 Kageishi, Nishiawakura-son, Aida-gun, Okayama-ken 707-0503; Japan
- Coordinates: 35°11′20″N 134°20′13″E
- Operator: Chizu Express
- Line: ■ Chizu Express Chizu Line
- Distance: 40.6 km (25.2 miles) from Kamigōri
- Platforms: 1 island platform
- Tracks: 2

Other information
- Status: Unstaffed
- Website: Official website

History
- Opened: 3 December 1994

Passengers
- 2018: 15 daily
Location
- Location within Okayama Prefecture Location within Japan

Awakura-Onsen Station (あわくら温泉駅, Awakura-Onsen-eki) is a passenger railway station located in the village of Nishiawakura, Aida District, Okayama Prefecture, Japan. It is operated by the third-sector semi-public railway operator Chizu Express.

== Lines ==
Awakura-Onsen Station is served by the Chizu Express Chizu Line and is 40.6 kilometers from the terminus of the line at Kamigōri

== Station layout ==
The station consists of one island platform located on an embankment, with the station building connected by stairs. Platform 2 is only used when exchanging trains and waiting for passing trains. The station is unattended.

1	■ Chizu Line	for Chizu, Tottori and Kurayoshi for Kamigōri, Osaka, Kyoto and Okayama
2	■ Chizu Line	siding to permit passage of express trains

== Adjacent stations ==
«	Service	»
Chizu Express
Chizu Line
Limited Express "Super Inaba": Does not stop at this station
Limited Express "Super Hakuto": Does not stop at this station
Nishi-Awakura	Local	Yamasato

== History ==
Awakura-Onsen Station opened on December 3, 1994 with the opening of the Chizu Line.

== Passenger statistics ==
In fiscal 2018, the station was used by an average of 5 passengers daily.

== Surrounding area ==
- Awakura Hot Spring
- Japan National Route 373l

== See also ==
- List of railway stations in Japan
