= Miyamoto Musashi Budokan =

Japanese Budōkan

- 宮本武蔵顕彰武蔵武道館
- Budokan
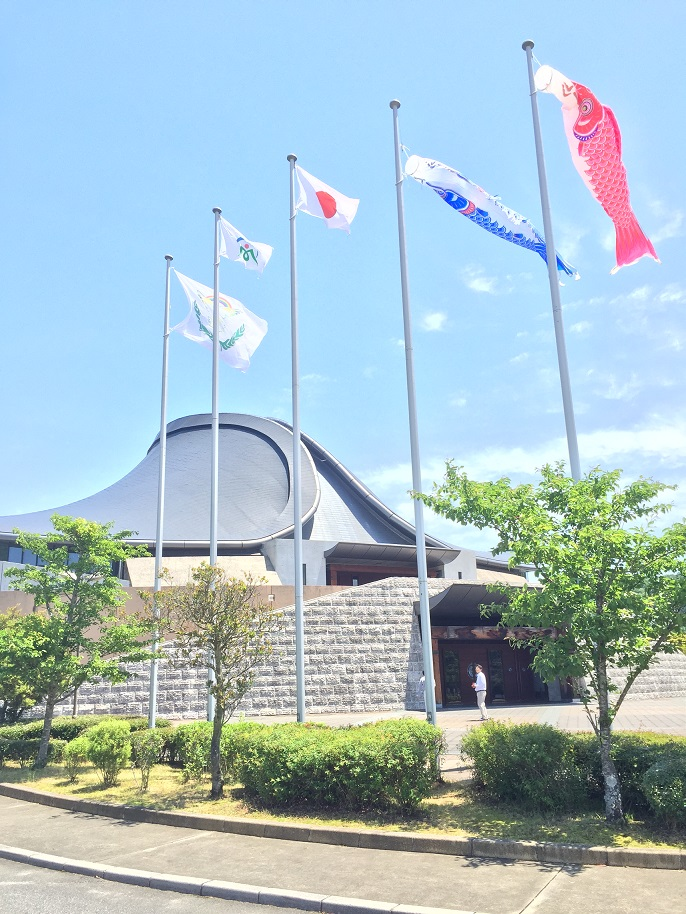
- Interactive map of Miyamoto Musashi Budokan
- Location: Ōhara, Okayama, Japan
- Coordinates: 35°5′52.67″N 134°19′35.32″E
- Surface: 6049 m²
- Public transit: Chizu Express, Chizu line, Ōhara Station (Okayama), Miyamoto Musashi Station

Construction
- Opened: May 20, 2000
- Architect: 沼田 亘さん - Wataru Numata

The Miyamoto Musashi Budokan (a budōkan (武 道 館) is a dōjō (道場) where budō (武 道) is practiced; the word kan (館) means "house") built in the province of Mimasaka in Ōhara-Cho, the birthplace of Miyamoto Musashi (March 12, 1584, Ōhara-Chō - May 19, 1645) was inaugurated on May 20, 2000 for the anniversary of his death. This budokan is dedicated to the official martial arts of Japan. It brings together all the saber and kendo traditional schools. The inauguration took place in the presence of many Japanese officials including Sensei Tadashi Chihara, guarantor and tenth of the line of Miyamoto Musashi (who attended the building’s inauguration); the mayor of Ōhara-Cho, Fukuda Yoshiaki; Élisabeth Lamure, mayor of Gleizé; and several saber and kendo schools representative of traditional and contemporary Japan.

== Infrastructure ==
The main arena on the first floor accommodates six kendo courts. The second floor contains 838 spectator seats. International kendo competitions are regularly held there.

- Main arena 1,376 m^{2} (42 m x 32 m), (139 ft x 105 ft)
  - 6 kendo (11 m x 11 m), (36 ft x 36 ft)
  - 2 volleyball
  - 1 basketball
  - 8 badminton
- Room dedicated to Budo 322 m^{2} (23 m x 14 m), (75 ft x 46 ft)
  - 2 Kendo (9 m x 9 m), (29 ft x 29 ft)
  - 2 Judo

Auxiliary facilities: training room, meeting room, fitness room, health / physical consultation room, rest room, equipment depot, changing rooms, shower rooms, room dedicated to broadcasting, offices

== Architecture ==
The project was designed by Sensei Tadashi Chihara, guarantor and tenth of the line of Miyamoto Musashi. The architectural design of the Miyamoto Musashi Budokan was entrusted to Wataru Numata.

The structure of the main arena surrounded by two floors above the ground is made of reinforced concrete. The total floor area is 6049 m^{2} (the first floor of 4252 m^{2} and the second floor 1797 m^{2}). The building has been certified by Heart Building.

This Budokan represents a samurai helmet or kabuto symbol of the Okayama prefecture and recalls the label as well as the central personality of the Japanese culture and native of the country, Musashi.

The delivery took place in May 2000 preceding the inauguration of May 20, 2000, in memory of the anniversary date of Miyamoto Musashi (March 12, 1584, Ōhara-Chō - May 19, 1645).

== Access by transport ==
Chizu Express, Chizu Line, Miyamoto Musashi Station 10 minutes on foot.

Views of Miyamoto Musashi station

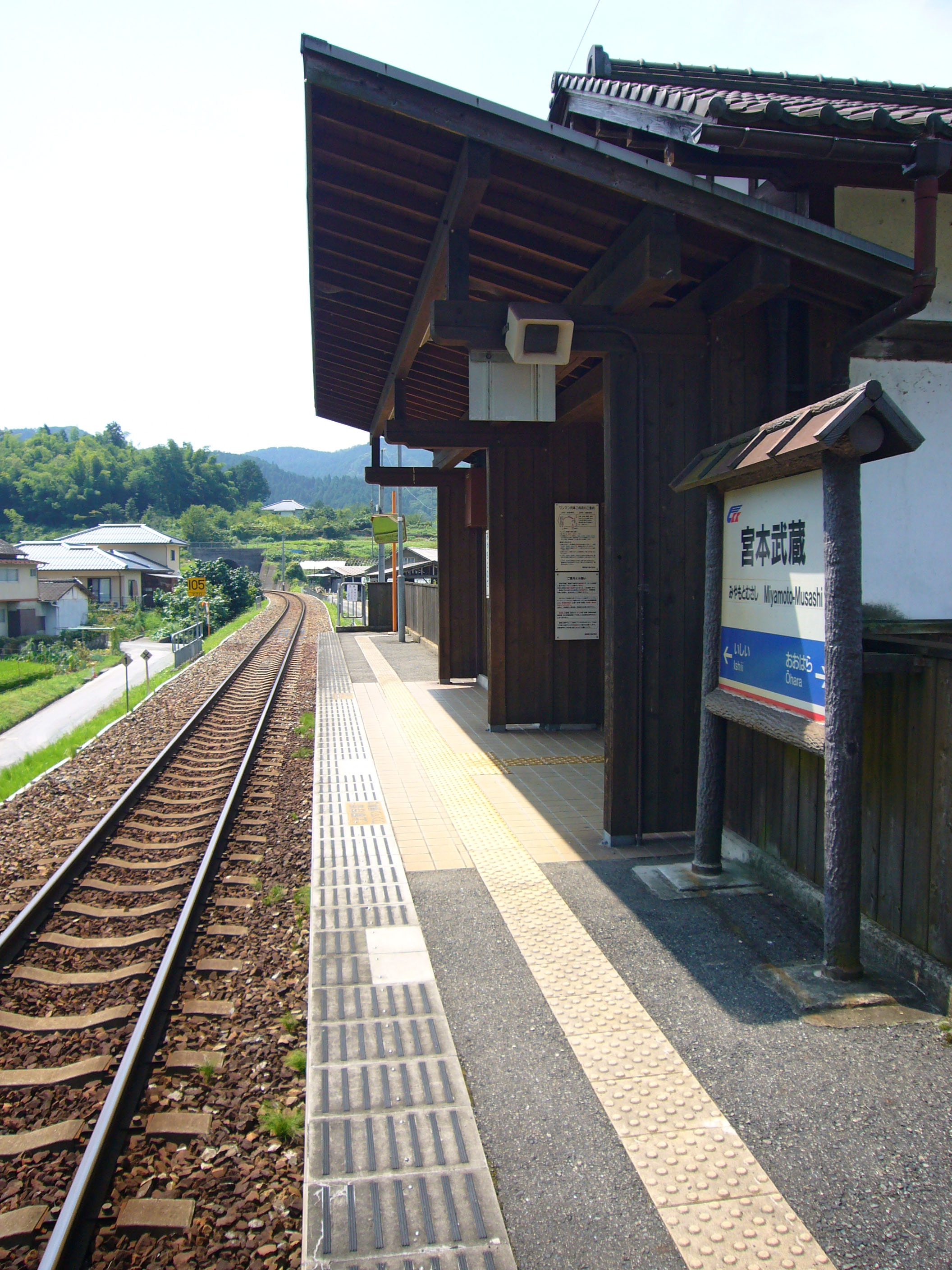

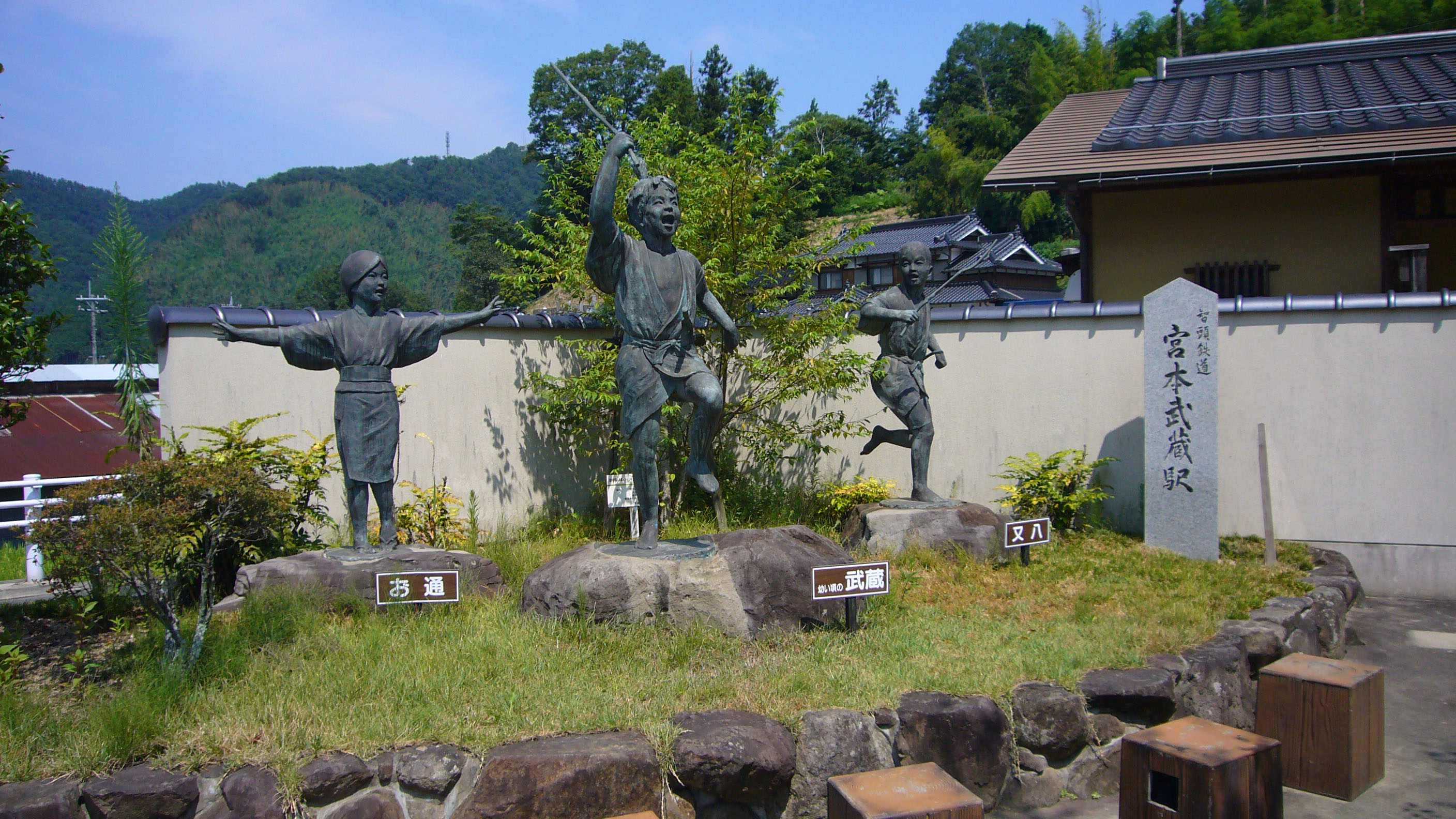
