= Kuzaki Station =

Railway station in Sayō, Hyōgo Prefecture, Japan

Kuzaki Station 久崎駅
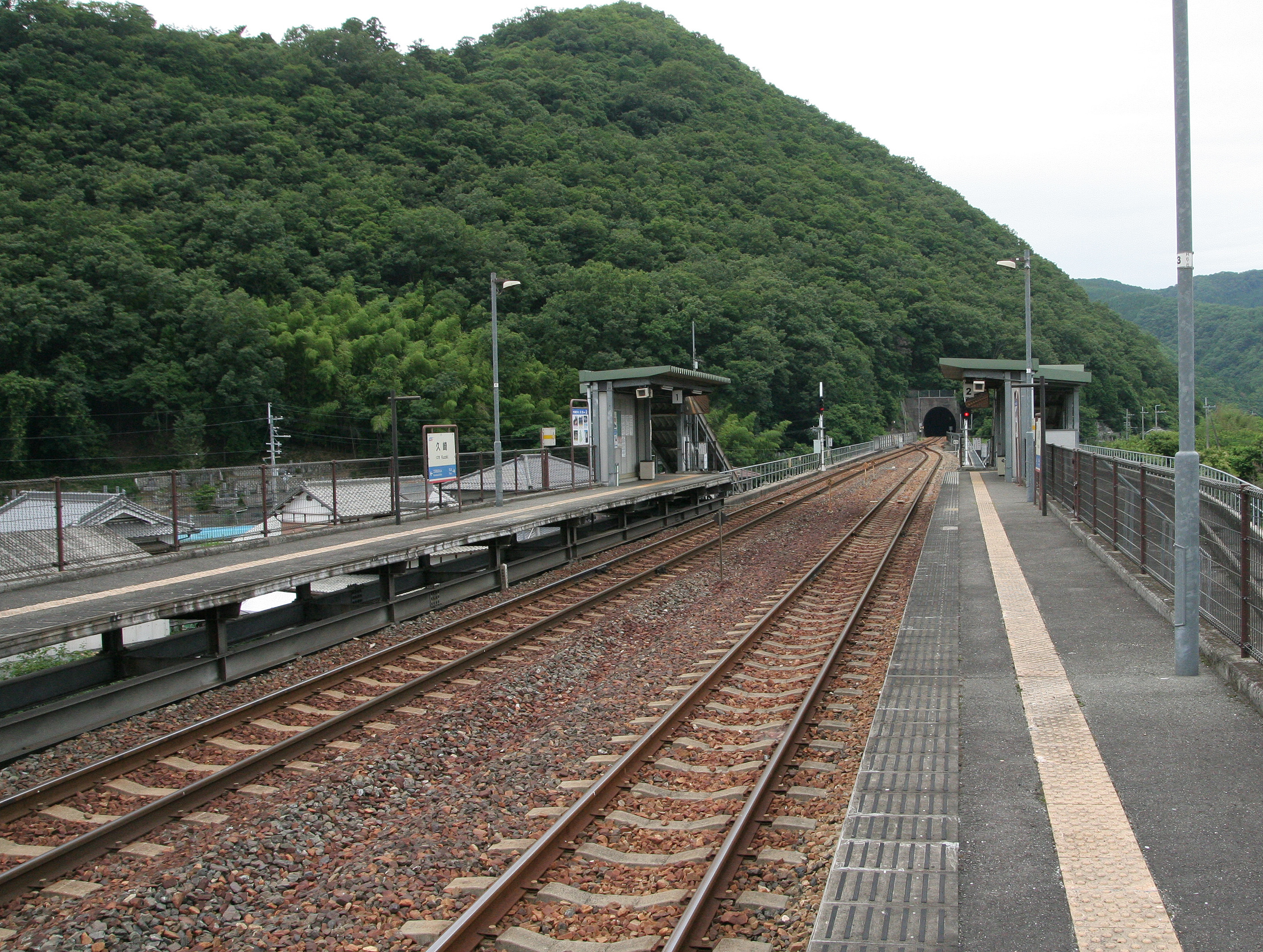
- Kuzaki Station in June 2008

General information
- Location: 104-2 Kuzaki, Sayō-chō, Sayō-gun, Hyōgo-ken 679-5641; Japan
- Coordinates: 34.9600°N 134.3444°E
- Line: ■ Chizu Express Chizu Line
- Distance: 12.2 km (7.6 miles) from Kamigōri
- Platforms: 2 side platforms
- Connections: Bus stop

Other information
- Status: Unstaffed
- Website: Official website

History
- Opened: 3 December 1994

Passengers
- FY2018: 80 daily
Location
- Location within Hyōgo Prefecture Location within Japan

Kuzaki Station (久崎駅, Kuzaki-eki) is a passenger railway station located in the town of Sayō, Sayō District, Hyōgo Prefecture, Japan. It is operated by the third-sector semi-public railway operator Chizu Express.

== Lines ==
Kuzaki Station is served by the Chizu Line and is 12.2 kilometers from the terminus of the line at Kamigōri.

== Station layout ==
The station consists of two elevated opposed side platforms with the station building underneath. Platform 1 is the main platform and is used by trains operating both directions. Platform 2 is the secondary platform and is used only for changing trains and waiting for passing trains. The station is unattended.

=== Platforms ===
1	■ Chizu Line	for Chizu, Tottori and Kurayoshi
2	■ Chizu Line	for Kamigori, Osaka, Kyoto and Okayama

== Adjacent stations ==
«	Service	»
Chizu Express
Chizu Line
Limited Expres Super Inaba: Does not stop at this station
Limited Express Super Hakuto: Does not stop at this station
Konohara-Enshin	Local	Sayo

== History ==
Kuzaki Station opened on December 3, 1994 with the opening of the Chizu Line.

== Passenger statistics ==
In fiscal 2018, the station was used by an average of 80 passengers daily.

== Surrounding area ==
- Chikusa River
- Sasagaoka Park

== See also ==
- List of railway stations in Japan
