= Ōhara Station =

Ōhara Station is the name of multiple train stations in Japan.

- Ōhara Station (Chiba) - (大原駅) in Chiba Prefecture
- Ōhara Station (Okayama) - (大原駅) in Okayama Prefecture
