= Kōnohara-Enshin Station =

Railway station in Kamigōri, Hyōgo Prefecture, Japan

Kōnohara-Enshin Station 河野原円心駅
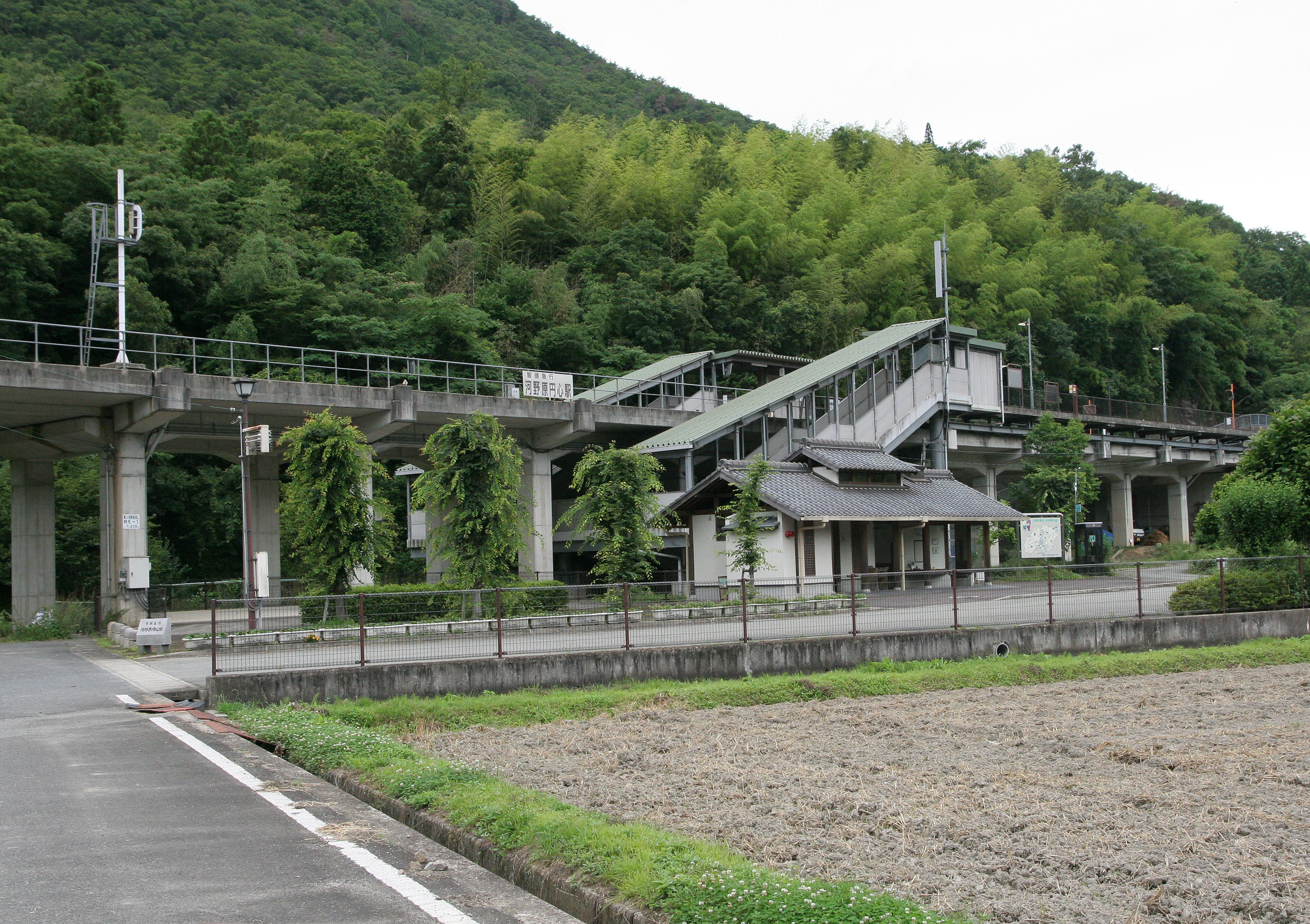
- Kōnohara-Enshin Station in June 2008

General information
- Location: Kamigōri, Akō District, Hyōgo Prefecture; Japan
- Coordinates: 34°55′08″N 134°21′10″E
- Operator: Chizu Express
- Line: ■ Chizu Express Chizu Line
Location
- Location within Japan

Kōnohara-Enshin Station (河野原円心駅, Kōnohara-Enshin-eki) is a railway station in Kamigōri, Akō District, Hyōgo Prefecture, Japan, operated by the third-sector semi-public railway operator Chizu Express.

== Lines ==
Kōnohara-Enshin Station is served by the Chizu Express Chizu Line.

== Adjacent stations ==
«	Service	»
Chizu Express
Chizu Line
Limited Express Super Inaba: Does not stop at this station
Limited Express Super Hakuto: Does not stop at this station
Kokenawa	Local	Kuzaki

== See also ==
- List of railway stations in Japan
