= Chizu Express =

Japanese third-sector railway

Chizu Express Company
- Native name: 智頭急行株式会社
- Company type: Third-sector
- Genre: Rail transport
- Founded: 31 May 1986
- Headquarters: Japan
- Area served: Hyōgo, Okayama and Tottori prefectures
- Services: Passenger railway
- Website: www.chizukyu.co.jp

Chizu Express (智頭急行株式会社, Chizu kyūkō Kabushikigaisha) is a Japanese third-sector railway that connects Hyōgo, Okayama and Tottori prefectures. Chizu Express operates one line, the Chizu Line.

Unlike the majority of third-sector railway companies which operate at a loss, Chizu Express makes a profit due to the track access fees paid by West Japan Railway Company (JR West) to use the Chizu Line for its Limited Express trains Super Hakuto and Super Inaba. Net profit after tax for the 2024-2025 financial year was ¥263,580,481.

== Chizu Express Chizu Line ==
Chizu Express Chizu Line
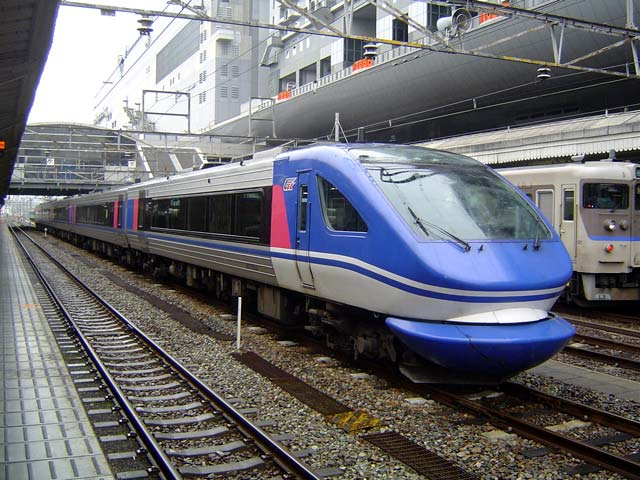
- A Chizu Express HOT7000 series train

Overview
- Native name: 智頭急行智頭線
- Status: In operation
- Owner: Chizu Express
- Locale: Hyōgo, Okayama and Tottori prefectures
- Termini: Kamigōri; Chizu
- Stations: 14

Service
- Type: Regional rail
- Operator(s): Chizu Express
- Rolling stock: HOT7000 series DMU, HOT3500 series DMU, KiHa 187 series DMU

History
- Opened: 3 December 1994

Technical
- Line length: 56.1 km (34.9 mi)
- Number of tracks: Entire line single tracked
- Character: Rural
- Track gauge: 1,067 mm (3 ft 6 in)
- Minimum radius: 260 m
- Electrification: None
- Operating speed: 130 km/h (81 mph)

The Chizu Line connects Kamigōri Station in Kamigōri, Hyōgo Prefecture and Chizu Station in Chizu, Tottori Prefecture.

The 56.1 km (34.9 mi) Chizu Line is not electrified, but is a high-grade railroad with an operating speed of 130 km/h (81 mph). JR West Limited Express services Super Hakuto and Super Inaba operate on this line.

Some local trains operate a through service from Chizu to/from Tottori on the JR West Inbi Line.

Name	Japanese	Distance (km)	Transfers	Location	
Kamigōri	上郡	0.0	Sanyo Main Line	Hyōgo	Kamigōri, Akō District
Kokenawa	苔縄	4.8		Hyōgo	Kamigōri, Akō District
Konohara-Enshin	河野原円心	7.4		Hyōgo	Kamigōri, Akō District
Kuzaki	久崎	12.2		Hyōgo	Sayō, Sayō District
Sayo	佐用	17.2	Kishin Line	Hyōgo	Sayō, Sayō District
Hirafuku	平福	22.5		Hyōgo	Sayō, Sayō District
Ishii	石井	27.1		Hyōgo	Sayō, Sayō District
Miyamoto-Musashi	宮本武蔵	30.6		Okayama	Mimasaka
Ōhara	大原	33.2		Okayama	Mimasaka
Nishi-Awakura	西粟倉	37.4		Okayama	Nishiawakura, Aida District
Awakura-Onsen	あわくら温泉	40.6		Okayama	Nishiawakura, Aida District
Yamasato	山郷	47.2		Tottori	Chizu, Yazu District
Koi-Yamagata	恋山形	50.0		Tottori	Chizu, Yazu District
Chizu	智頭	56.1	Inbi Line	Tottori	Chizu, Yazu District
Through service to Tottori on the Inbi Line

== History ==
Construction of the line was approved under the Railway Construction Act in 1922 and commenced by Japanese National Railways (JNR) in June 1966. Work was well advanced when a freeze on expenditure in 1980 resulted in construction being halted with 95% of the route acquired and 93% of the earthworks completed.

The Tottori Prefectural Government facilitated the establishment of the Chizu Express Company in May 1986, which resumed construction.

The line opened on December 3, 1994, and includes the 5,592 m Shitozaka tunnel.

On the same day JR West's Super Hakuto Limited Express service commenced operation Shin-Osaka — Osaka — Tottori — Kurayoshi using the Chizu Line. Travel time between Osaka & Tottori was reduced to 2.5 hours, 1.5 hours faster than previous Limited Express trains. Trains were extended to operate to/from Kyoto - initially as a temporary train[ja] from April 1995 then permanently for all trains from March 16, 1996. From March 16, 2024, 5 round trips were changed to operate to/from Osaka instead of Kyoto, leaving Kyoto with only 2 trips in each direction per day.

From November 29, 1997, the JR West Limited Express Super Inaba service commenced between Okayama and Tottori.

== See also ==
- List of railway lines in Japan
