= Koi-Yamagata Station =

Railway station in Chizu, Tottori Prefecture, Japan

Coordinates: 35.2556°N 134.2790°E

Koi-Yamagata Station 恋山形駅
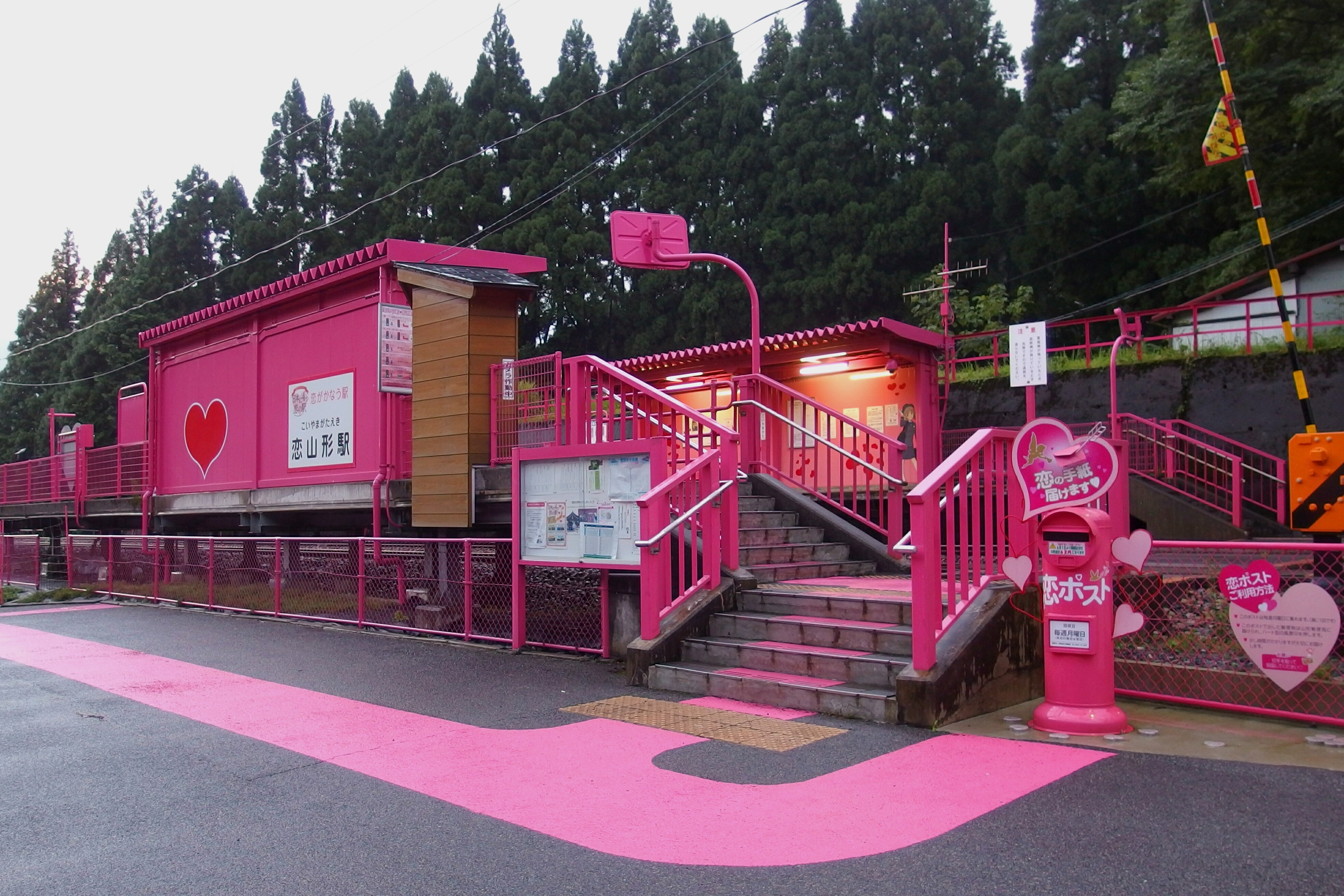
- The Koi-Yamagata station as it appeared in August 2017, following its 2013 repaint.

General information
- Location: 159-3 Ouchi, Chizu-cho, Yazu-gun, Tottori-ken 689-1421; Japan
- Operator: Chizu Express
- Line: ■ Chizu Express Chizu Line
- Distance: 50.0 km (31.1 mi) from Kamigōri
- Platforms: 2 side platforms
- Tracks: 2

Construction
- Structure type: At grade

Other information
- Website: Official website

History
- Opened: 3 December 1994

Passengers
- 2018: 5 daily
Location
- Location within Tottori Prefecture Location within Japan

Koi-Yamagata Station (恋山形駅, Koiyamagata-eki) is a passenger railway station located in the town of Chizu, Yazu District, Tottori, Japan. It is operated by the third-sector semi-public railway operator Chizu Express.

== Lines ==
Koi-Yamagata Station is served by the 56.1 km Chizu Express Chizu Line from Kamigōri to Chizu, and lies 50.0 km from Kamigōri.

== Layout ==
The station consists of two ground-level opposed side platforms with simple shelter facilities for passengers. The platforms are connected by a level crossing. There is no station building, and the station is unattended.

=== Platforms ===
1	■ Chizu Line	for Chizu, Tottori and Kurayoshi
2	■ Chizu Line	for Kamigori, Osaka, Kyoto and Okayama

== Adjacent stations ==
«	Service	»
Chizu Express Chizu Line
Limited Express "Super Inaba": Does not stop at this station
Limited Express "Super Hakuto": Does not stop at this station
Yamasato	Local	Chizu

== Gallery ==
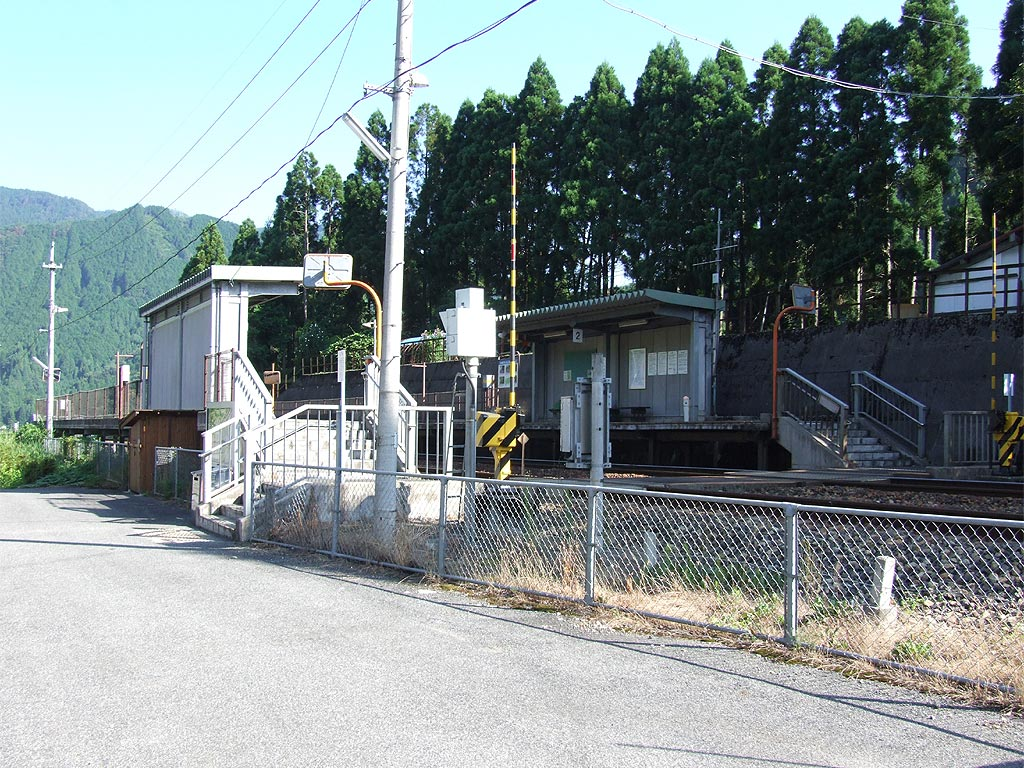
The station as it appeared in August 2008, prior to its repaint.

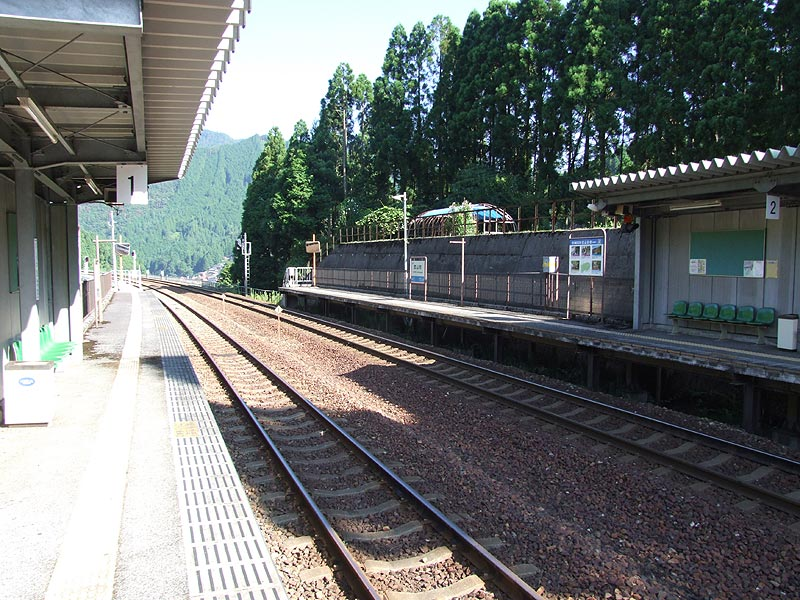
The platforms as they also appeared in August 2008.

== History ==
Koi-Yamagata Station opened on 3 December 1994 with the opening of the Chizu Line.

On 9 June 2013, as a nod to "koi" (the Japanese word for love) appearing in the station's name, the station's shelters and fences were repainted in vivid pink, and the station's signs were replaced with heart-shaped equivalents.

== Passenger statistics ==
In fiscal 2018, the station was used by an average of 5 passengers daily.

== Surrounding area ==
- Yamagata Elementary School (closed)
- Japan National Route 373
