= Kokenawa Station =

Railway station in Kamigōri, Hyōgo Prefecture, Japan

Kokenawa Station 苔縄駅
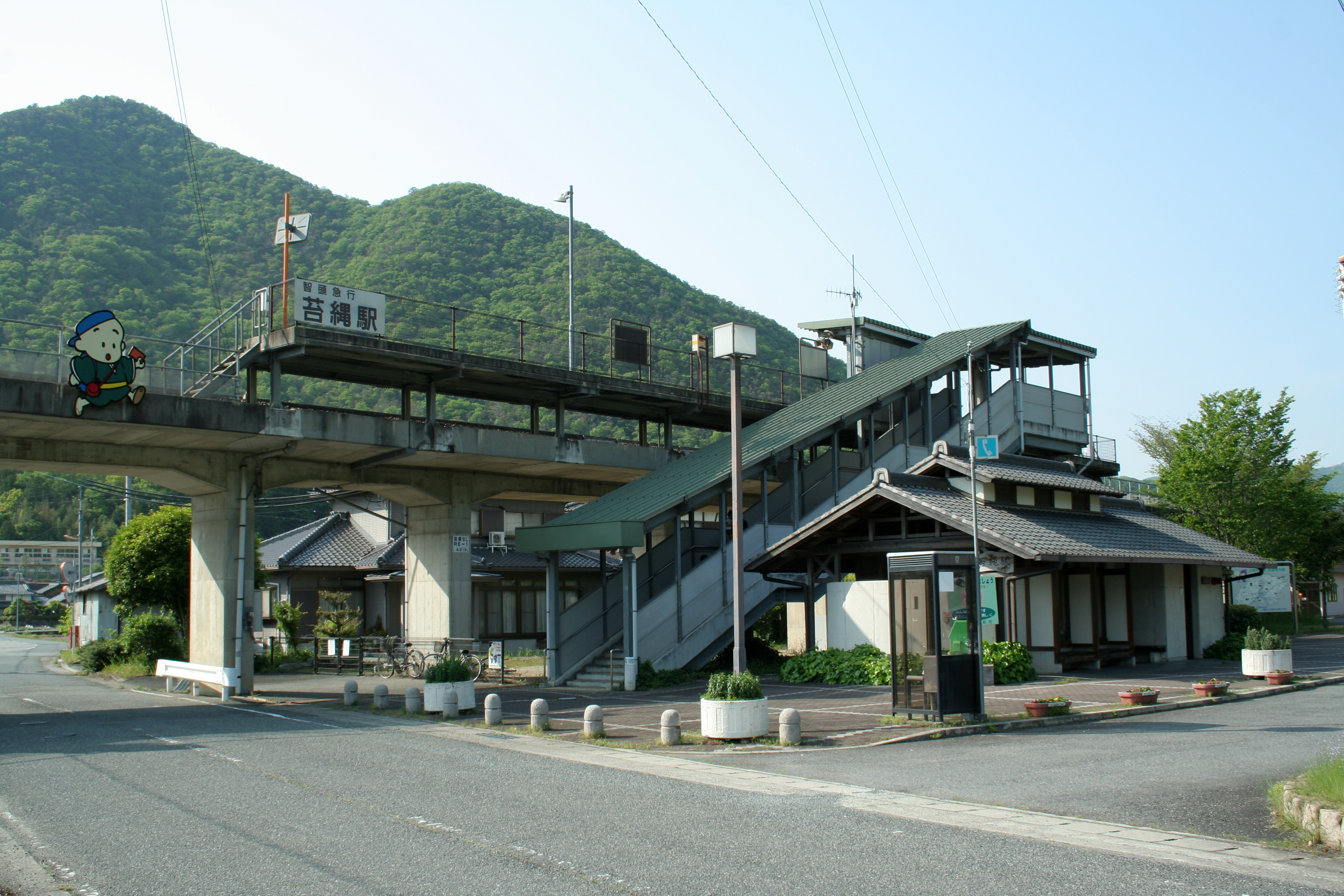
- Kokenawa Station in May 2009

General information
- Location: Japan
- Coordinates: 34.8964°N 134.3538°E
- Operator: Chizu Express
- Line: ■ Chizu Express Chizu Line
- Platforms: 1
Location
- Location within Japan

Kokenawa Station (苔縄駅, Kokenawa-eki) is a railway station in Kamigōri, Akō District, Hyōgo Prefecture, Japan, operated by the third-sector semi-public railway operator Chizu Express.

== Lines ==
Kokenawa Station is served by the Chizu Express Chizu Line.

== Adjacent stations ==
«	Service	»
Chizu Express
Chizu Line
Limited Express Super Inaba: Does not stop at this station
Limited Express Super Hakuto: Does not stop at this station
Kamigōri	Local	Konohara-Enshin

== See also ==
- List of railway stations in Japan
