= Yamasato Station =

Railway station in Chizu, Tottori Prefecture, Japan

Yamasato Station 山郷駅
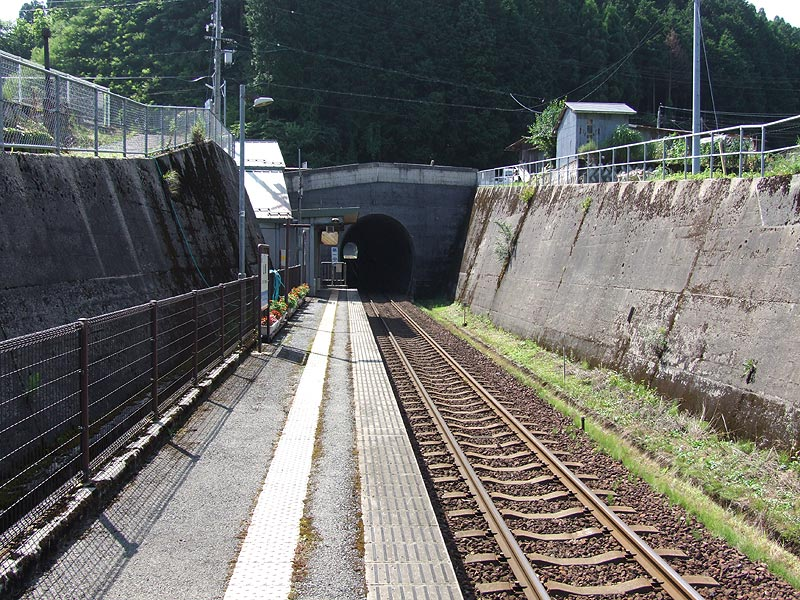
- Yamasato Station platform in August 2008

General information
- Location: Nakabara, Chizu-cho, Yazu-gun, Tottori-ken 689-1423; Japan
- Coordinates: 35.2324°N 134.2891°E
- Operator: Chizu Express
- Line: ■ Chizu Express Chizu Line
- Distance: 47.2 from Kamigōri
- Platforms: 1 side platform

Other information
- Status: Unstaffed
- Website: Official website

History
- Opened: 3 December 1994

Passengers
- FY2018: 14
Location
- Location within Tottori Prefecture Location within Japan

Yamasato Station (山郷駅, Yamasato-eki) is a passenger railway station located in the town of Chizu, Yazu District, Tottori, Japan. It is operated by the third-sector semi-public railway operator Chizu Express.

== Lines ==
Yamasato Station is served by the Chizu Express Chizu Line and is 47.2 kilometers from the terminus of the line at Kamigōri.

== Station layout ==
The station consists of one side platform serving a single bi-directional track. The platform is located on in a cutting and is reached by stairs. The station is unattended.

== Adjacent stations ==
| « | Service | » |
Chizu Express Chizu Line
Limited Express "Super Inaba": Does not stop at this station
Limited Express "Super Hakuto": Does not stop at this station
| Awakura-Onsen | Local | Koi-Yamagata |

== History ==
Yamasato Station opened on December 3, 1994, with the opening of the Chizu Line.

== Passenger statistics ==
In fiscal 2018, the station was used by an average of 14 passengers daily.

== Surrounding area ==
- Former Chizu Town Yamago Elementary School
- Tottori Expressway Chizu South Interchange

== See also ==
- List of railway stations in Japan
