= Suwa Shrine =

Suwa Shrine (諏訪神社, Suwa Jinja) may refer to:

- Suwa shrine, part of the Shinto shrine network headed by Suwa taisha, in Nagano Prefecture
- Suwa Shrine (Nagasaki), major Shinto shrine in Nagasaki, Japan
- Suwa Shrine (Tottori), Shinto shrine in Chizu, Tottori Prefecture, Japan
