= Chizu, Tottori =

Chizu 智頭町
- Town
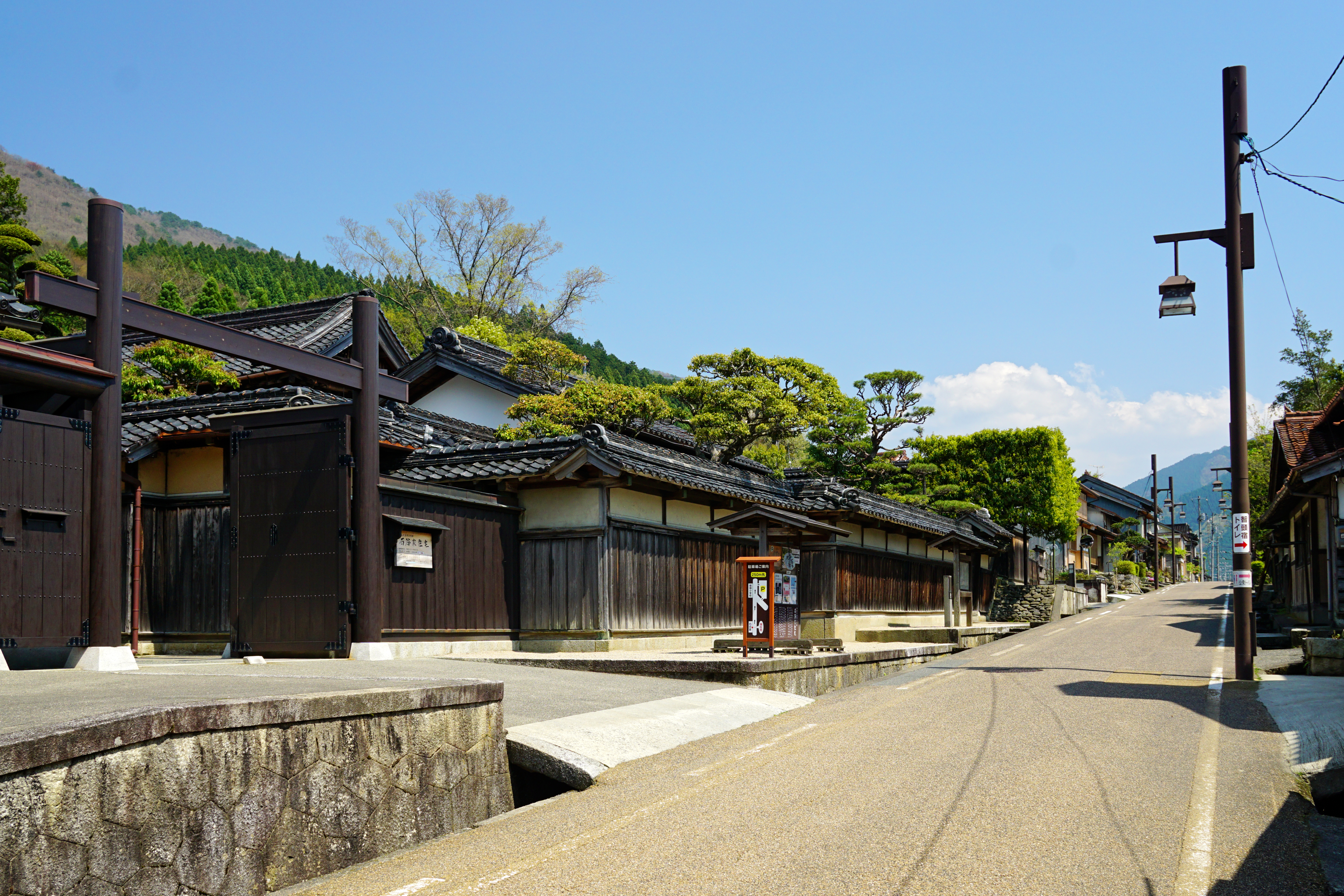
- View of Chizu-shuku

- Flag Emblem
- Interactive map of Chizu
- Location in Japan
- Coordinates: 35°16′N 134°14′E
- Country: Japan
- Region: Chūgoku; San'in
- Prefecture: Tottori
- District: Yazu

Government
  - Mayor: Hideo Kaneko (Liberal Democratic Party)

Area
  - Total: 224.7 km^{2} (86.8 sq mi)

Population (October 1, 2025)
  - Total: 5,992
  - Density: 26.67/km^{2} (69.07/sq mi)
- Time zone: UTC+09:00 (JST)
- City hall address: 2072-1 Chizu, Chizu-cho, Yazu-gun, Tottori-ken 689-1402
- Climate: Cfa
- Website: Official website

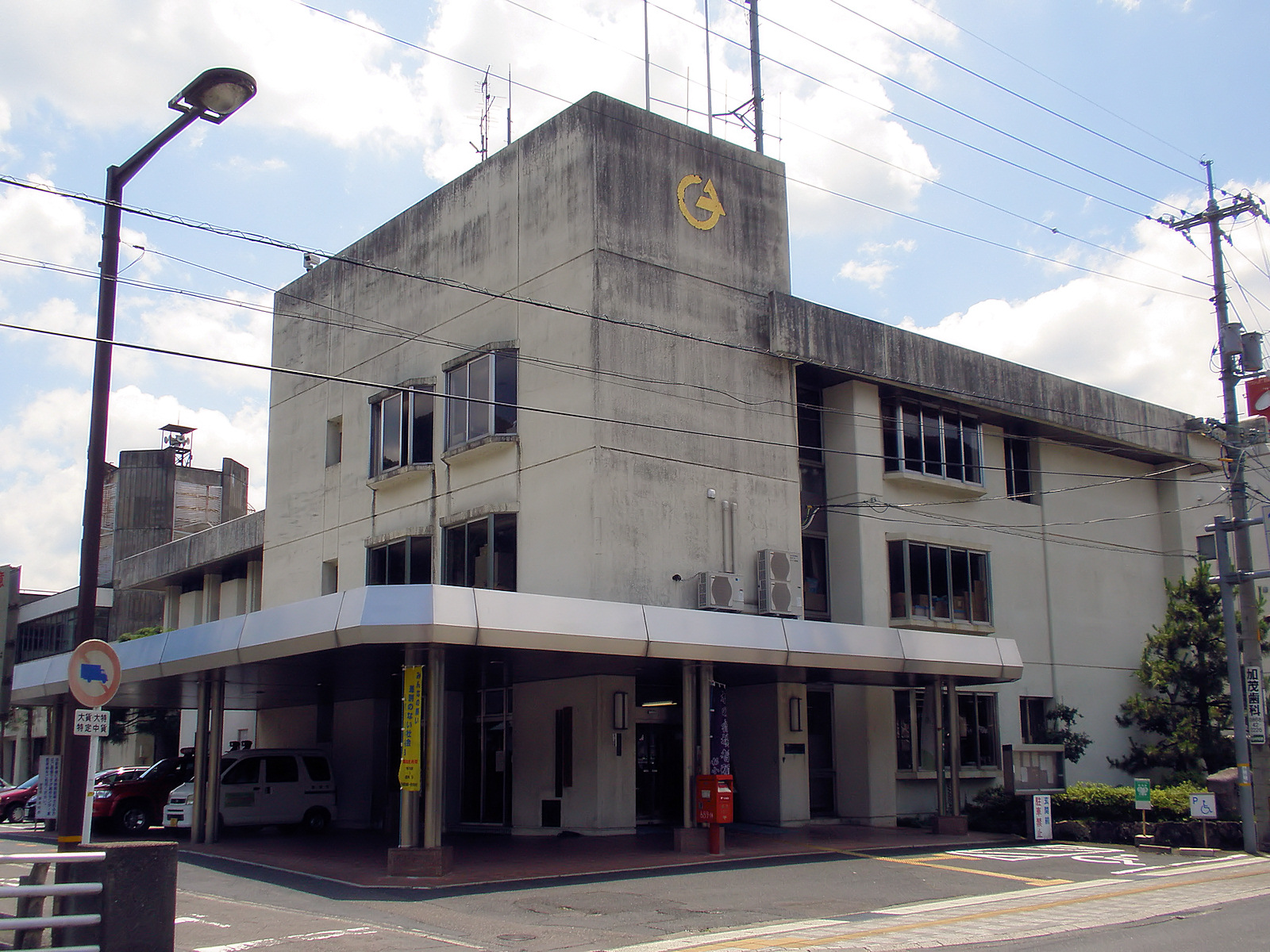
Chizu Town Hall

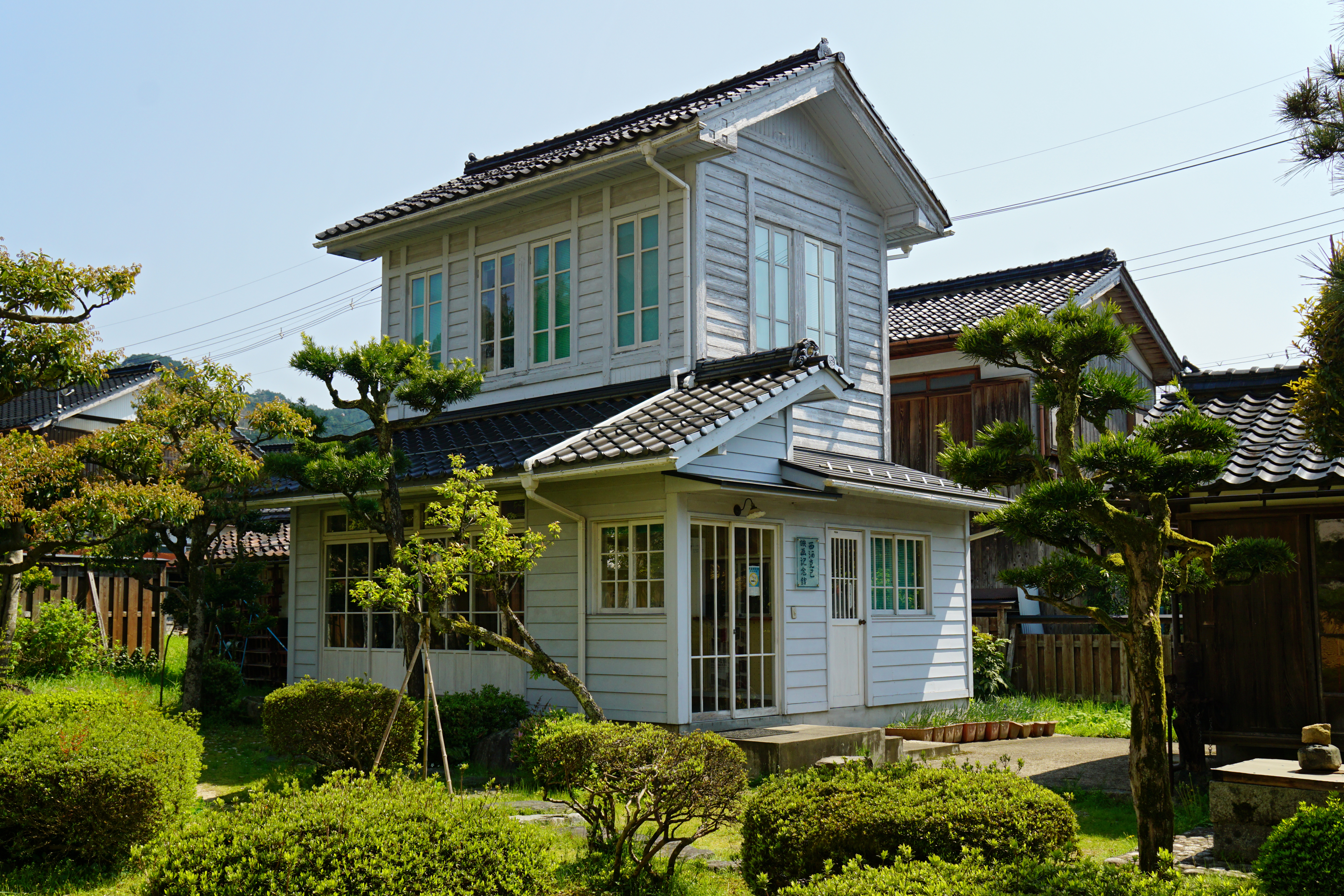
Katsumi Nishikawa Film Museum

Chizu (智頭町, Chizu-chō) is a town located in Yazu District, Tottori Prefecture, Japan. As of 1 January 2024, the town had an estimated population of 5,906 in 2681 households and a population density of 26.67 persons per km^{2}. The total area of the town is 224.70 square kilometres (86.76 sq mi).

== Geography ==
Chizu is located in the southeastern part of Tottori Prefecture, near the border with Okayama Prefecture. Mountains and forests occupy 93% of the town area, and it is designated as a heavy snowfall area.

=== Neighboring municipalities ===
Okayama Prefecture

- Mimasaka
- Nagi
- Nishiawakura
- Tsuyama

Tottori Prefecture

- Tottori
- Wakasa
- Yazu

=== Climate ===
Chizu has a humid subtropical climate (Köppen Cfa) characterized by warm, wet summers and cold winters with heavy snowfall. The average annual temperature in Chizu is 13.1 °C (55.6 °F). The average annual rainfall is 1,972.2 mm (77.65 in) with September as the wettest month. The temperatures are highest on average in August, at around 25.2 °C (77.4 °F), and lowest in January, at around 1.6 °C (34.9 °F). Its record high is 38.9 °C (102.0 °F), reached on 5 August 2018, and its record low is −12.7 °C (9.1 °F), reached on 31 January 2011.

Climate data for Chizu (1991−2020 normals, extremes 1978−present)
| Month | Jan | Feb | Mar | Apr | May | Jun | Jul | Aug | Sep | Oct | Nov | Dec | Year |
|---|---|---|---|---|---|---|---|---|---|---|---|---|---|
| Record high °C (°F) | 16.8 (62.2) | 20.9 (69.6) | 26.0 (78.8) | 31.4 (88.5) | 33.5 (92.3) | 36.5 (97.7) | 38.2 (100.8) | 38.9 (102.0) | 36.9 (98.4) | 30.7 (87.3) | 26.2 (79.2) | 20.7 (69.3) | 38.9 (102.0) |
| Mean daily maximum °C (°F) | 6.1 (43.0) | 7.1 (44.8) | 11.7 (53.1) | 18.1 (64.6) | 23.2 (73.8) | 26.2 (79.2) | 29.9 (85.8) | 31.3 (88.3) | 26.4 (79.5) | 20.9 (69.6) | 15.2 (59.4) | 9.1 (48.4) | 18.8 (65.8) |
| Daily mean °C (°F) | 1.6 (34.9) | 2.1 (35.8) | 5.7 (42.3) | 11.3 (52.3) | 16.5 (61.7) | 20.5 (68.9) | 24.5 (76.1) | 25.2 (77.4) | 21.0 (69.8) | 15.0 (59.0) | 9.3 (48.7) | 4.1 (39.4) | 13.1 (55.5) |
| Mean daily minimum °C (°F) | −1.8 (28.8) | −1.8 (28.8) | 0.6 (33.1) | 5.0 (41.0) | 10.5 (50.9) | 15.9 (60.6) | 20.6 (69.1) | 21.1 (70.0) | 16.9 (62.4) | 10.3 (50.5) | 4.7 (40.5) | 0.3 (32.5) | 8.5 (47.3) |
| Record low °C (°F) | −12.7 (9.1) | −12.3 (9.9) | −8.5 (16.7) | −4.3 (24.3) | 0.3 (32.5) | 5.2 (41.4) | 11.6 (52.9) | 13.3 (55.9) | 5.7 (42.3) | −0.2 (31.6) | −2.9 (26.8) | −8.8 (16.2) | −12.7 (9.1) |
| Average precipitation mm (inches) | 159.5 (6.28) | 143.3 (5.64) | 164.6 (6.48) | 130.9 (5.15) | 146.1 (5.75) | 168.9 (6.65) | 227.7 (8.96) | 172.8 (6.80) | 244.2 (9.61) | 158.6 (6.24) | 112.7 (4.44) | 143.0 (5.63) | 1,972.2 (77.65) |
| Average snowfall cm (inches) | 112 (44) | 117 (46) | 25 (9.8) | 0 (0) | 0 (0) | 0 (0) | 0 (0) | 0 (0) | 0 (0) | 0 (0) | 0 (0) | 40 (16) | 285 (112) |
| Average precipitation days (≥ 1.0 mm) | 17.2 | 16.4 | 15.6 | 11.7 | 10.9 | 12.7 | 13.9 | 11.2 | 12.8 | 11.2 | 12.3 | 15.2 | 161.1 |
| Average snowy days (≥ 3 cm) | 10.3 | 9.8 | 2.6 | 0 | 0 | 0 | 0 | 0 | 0 | 0 | 0 | 3.4 | 26.1 |
| Mean monthly sunshine hours | 75.4 | 82.2 | 131.5 | 173.7 | 191.3 | 133.2 | 133.1 | 169.7 | 124.9 | 141.0 | 112.3 | 84.6 | 1,552.7 |
Source: Japan Meteorological Agency

== Demography ==
Per Japanese census data, the population of Chizu has been as follows. The population has been steadily declining since the 1950s.

Historical population
| Year | Pop. | ±% |
|---|---|---|
| 1920 | 12,014 | — |
| 1930 | 12,973 | +8.0% |
| 1940 | 12,512 | −3.6% |
| 1950 | 14,472 | +15.7% |
| 1960 | 14,390 | −0.6% |
| 1970 | 12,392 | −13.9% |
| 1980 | 11,504 | −7.2% |
| 1990 | 10,670 | −7.2% |
| 2000 | 9,383 | −12.1% |
| 2010 | 7,719 | −17.7% |
| 2020 | 6,427 | −16.7% |

== History ==
Chizu is part of ancient Inaba Province. The temple of Gokuraku-ji was founded in 646 AD. During the Edo period, the area was part of the holdings of Tottori Domain ruled by a branch of the Ikeda clan from their seat at Tottori Castle. Yazu District, Tottori was established after the Meiji restoration and the village of Chizu was established with the creation of the modern municipalities system on October 1, 1889. It was elevated to town status on June 1, 1914. Chizu annexed the neighboring villages of Yamagata, Nagi and Haji on February 20, 1935, Tomizawa on February 26, 1936, and Yamago in June 1954.

== Government ==
Chizu has a mayor-council form of government with a directly elected mayor and a unicameral town council of 12 members. Chizu, collectively with the other municipalities of Yazu District, contributes two members to the Tottori Prefectural Assembly. The town is part of Tottori 1st district of the lower house of the Diet of Japan.

== Economy ==
The main industries of the area are logging, woodworking, tourism, and brewing. Chizu's forestry industry centers around a 300-year-old grove of cedar trees in the town center. These trees, once used to create wine barrels, are now typically harvested for construction and interior design.

== Education ==
Chizu has one public elementary school and one public junior high school operated by the town government, and one public high school operated by the Tottori Prefectural Board of Education.

== Transportation ==
=== Railway ===
JR West - Inbi Line

- Chizu - Haji -Nagi

Wakasa Railway - Wakasa Line

- Yamasato - Koi-Yamagata - Chizu

=== Highways ===
- Tottori Expressway
- National Route 53
- National Route 373

== Sister cities ==
- Yanggu County, Gangwon, South Korea, since October 10, 1999.
- Chiyoda, Tokyo, Japan, is collaborating with Chizu and several other municipalities on a carbon offsets program with the goal of reaching carbon neutrality by 2050. Chizu also provided cedar wood for the construction of an information center at Kanda Station in Tokyo in 2021.

== Local attractions ==
- Ishitani Residence, a mansion owned by a family of forestry magnates which was named an Important Cultural Property in 2009.
- Katsumi Nishikawa Film Museum
- Itaibara Village, which has Shōwa era buildings.
- Mitaki Dam
- Mount Nagi
- Suwa Shrine

== Noted people from Chizu ==
- Katsumi Nishikawa, movie director (1918–2010)
