= Super Inaba =

Japanese limited express train service

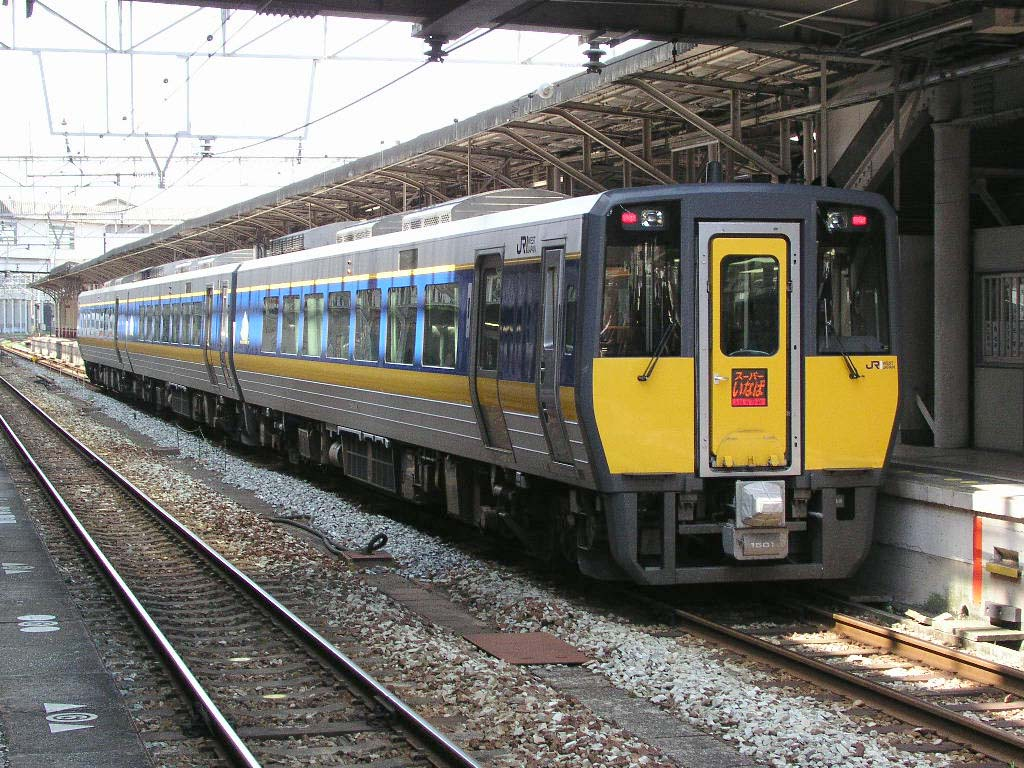
- KiHa 187-500 series Super Inaba

Overview
- Service type: Limited express
- Status: Operational
- First service: 1 October 2003
- Current operator: JR West

Route
- Termini: Okayama; Tottori
- Stops: 7
- Distance travelled: 141.8 km (88.1 mi)
- Average journey time: 1 hour 50 minutes approx
- Service frequency: 6 return workings daily
- Lines used: Sanyo Main Line, Chizu Express Chizu Line, Inbi Line

On-board services
- Class: Standard only
- Disabled access: Yes
- Sleeping arrangements: None
- Catering facilities: None
- Observation facilities: None
- Entertainment facilities: None
- Other facilities: Toilet

Technical
- Rolling stock: KiHa 187-500 series DMUs
- Track gauge: 1,067 mm (3 ft 6 in)
- Electrification: Diesel
- Operating speed: 120 km/h (75 mph)
- Track owners: JR West, Chizu Express

The Super Inaba (スーパーいなば) is a limited express train service in Japan operated by West Japan Railway Company (JR West) which runs between Okayama and Tottori.

== Stops ==
Trains stop at the following stations:

Okayama - Kamigōri - Sayo - Ōhara - Chizu - Kōge - Tottori

== Rolling stock ==
=== Super Inaba ===
Kiha 187-500 series DMUs (since October 2003)

=== Inaba ===
KiHa 181 series DMUs (November 1997 - September 2003)

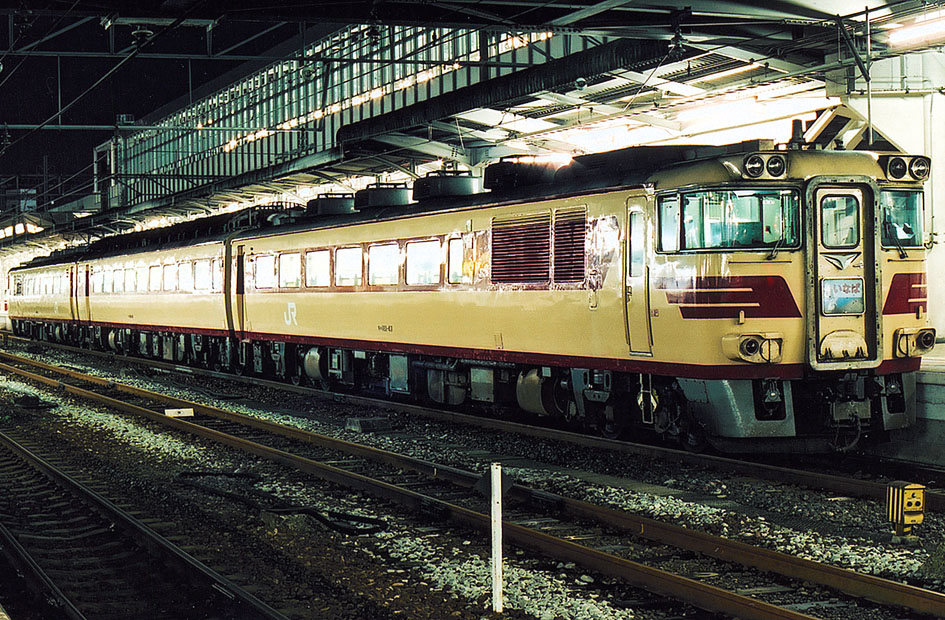
KiHa 181 series DMU on a Inaba service, 2003

== Formation ==
- Only Standard class available
- No smoking accommodation

=== Super Inaba ===
← Okayama/Tottori, Kamigōri →

Car No.	1	2
Accommodation	Reserved	Non-reserved

== History ==
Service began on 29 November 1997.

In October 2003, the KiHa 181 series DMUs operating on the former Inaba service were replaced by new KiHa 187 series trains, and the service was upgraded to become the Super Inaba.
