= Haji Station =

Railway station in Chizu, Tottori Prefecture, Japan

Haji Station 土師駅
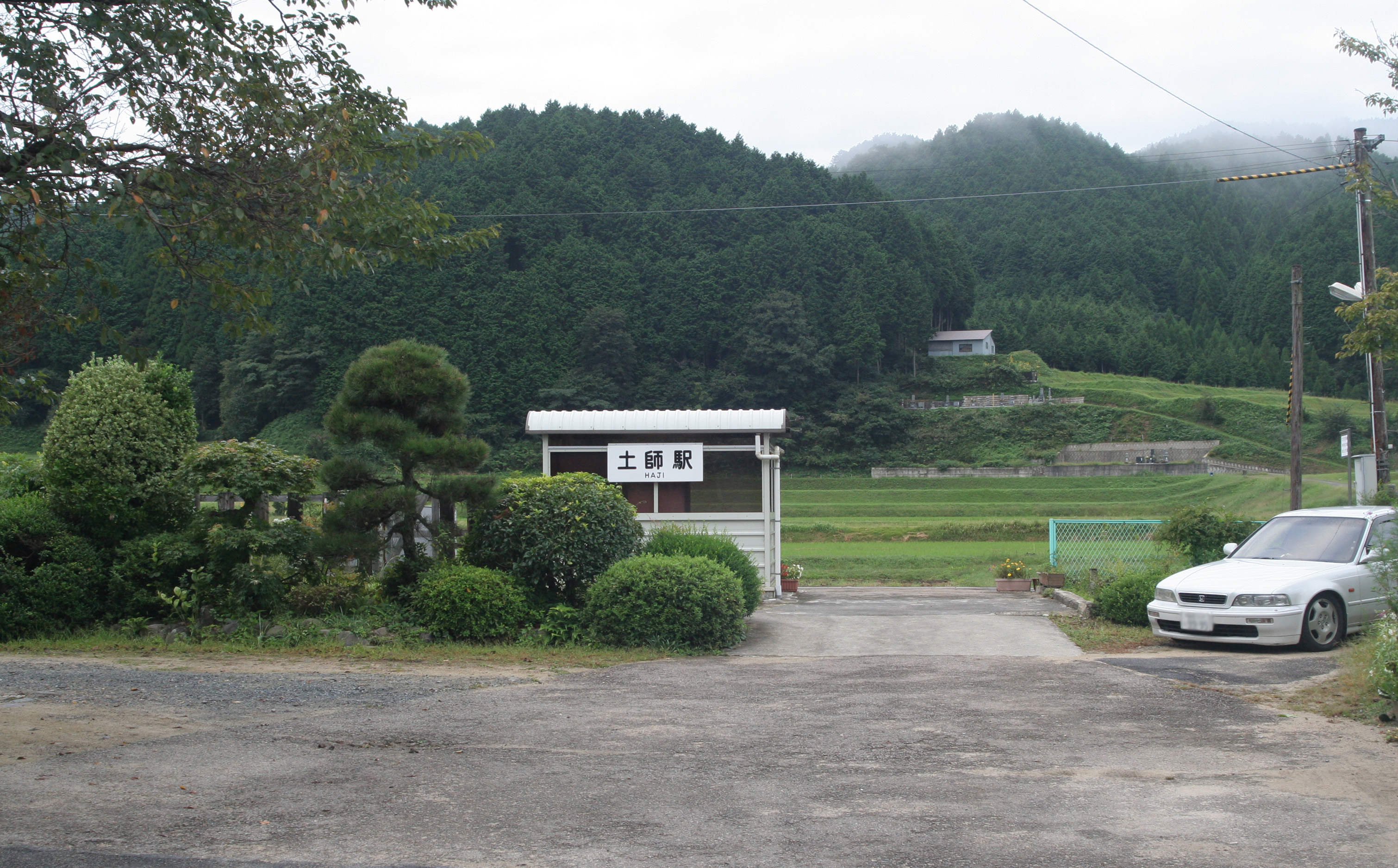
- Haji Station, October 2007

General information
- Location: Miyoshi, Chizu-cho, Yazu-gun, Tottori-ken 689-1434; Japan
- Coordinates: 35°13′58.52″N 134°13′32.85″E
- Owner: JR West
- Operator: JR West
- Line: Inbi Line
- Distance: 35.6 km (22.1 miles) from Tottori
- Platforms: 1 side platform
- Connections: Bus stop

Other information
- Status: Unstaffed
- Website: Official website

History
- Opened: 1 July 1932

Passengers
- FY2015: 50 daily
Location
- Location within Tottori Prefecture Location within Japan

Haji Station (土師駅, Haji-eki) is a passenger railway station located in the town of Chizu, Yazu District, Tottori Prefecture, Japan.. It is operated by the West Japan Railway Company (JR West).

== Lines ==
Haji Station is served by the Inbi Line, and is located 35.6 kilometers from the terminus of the line at Tottori. Only local trains stop at this station.

== Station layout ==
The station consists of one ground-level side platform serving a single bi-directional line. There is no station building, but only small shelter on the platform. The station is unattended.

== Adjacent stations ==
«	Service	»
West Japan Railway Company (JR West) Inbi Line
Chizu	Rapid	Nagi
Chizu	Local	Nagi

== History ==
Haji Station opened on July 1, 1932. With the privatization of the Japan National Railways (JNR) on April 1, 1987, the station came under the aegis of the West Japan Railway Company.

== Passenger statistics ==
In fiscal 2015, the station was used by an average of 50 passengers daily.

== Surrounding area ==
- Japan National Route 53.

== See also ==
- List of railway stations in Japan.
