= Une Station =

Railway station in Akō, Hyōgo Prefecture, Japan

Une Station 有年駅
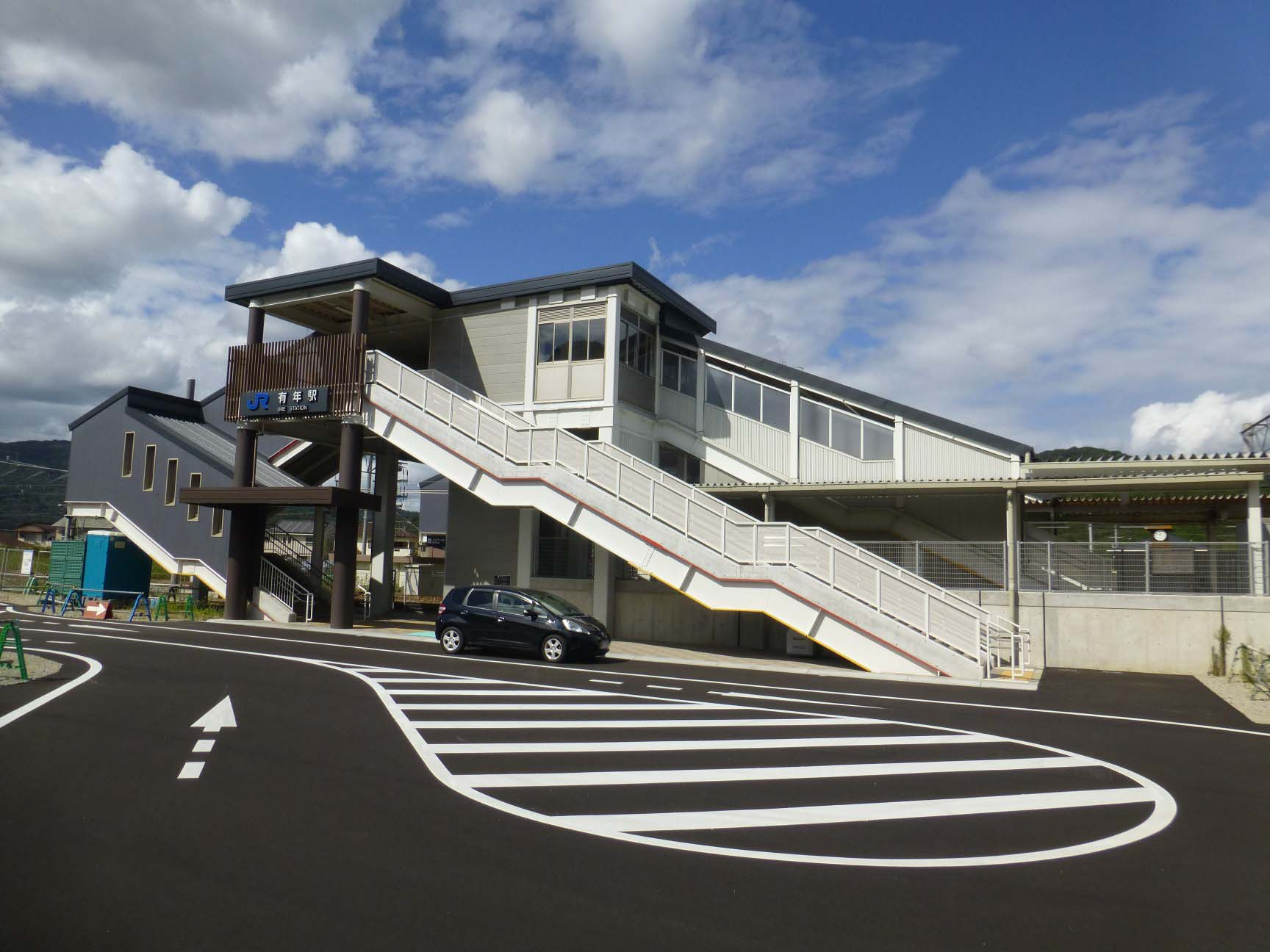
- Une Station in October 2018

General information
- Location: 177-4 Uneyokoo, Akō-shi, Hyōgo-ken 678-1184; Japan
- Coordinates: 34.8291°N 134.3958°E
- Owner: West Japan Railway Company
- Operator: West Japan Railway Company
- Line: San'yō Main Line
- Distance: 83.1 km (51.6 miles) from Kobe
- Platforms: 2 side platforms
- Tracks: 2
- Connections: Bus stop

Construction
- Structure type: Ground level

Other information
- Status: Staffed
- Website: Official website

History
- Opened: 10 July 1890

Passengers
- FY2019: 246 daily

Services
Preceding station	JR West	Following station
Kamigōri towards Mitsuishi	San'yō Line Local	Aioi towards Himeji
Location
- Location within Hyōgo Prefecture Location within Japan

Une Station (有年駅, Une-eki) is a passenger railway station located in the city of Akō, Hyōgo Prefecture, Japan, operated by the West Japan Railway Company (JR West).

== Lines ==
Une Station is served by the JR San'yō Main Line, and is located 83.1 kilometers from the terminus of the line at Kobe and 116.2 kilometers from Osaka.

== Station layout ==
The station consists of two opposed ground-level side platforms connected by an elevated station building. The station is staffed.

=== Platforms ===
1	■ San'yō Main Line	for Kamigōri and Okayama
2	■ San'yō Main Line	for Aioi and Himeji

== Adjacent stations ==
«	Service	»
JR West
Sanyō Main Line
Limited Express Super Hakuto: Does not stop at this station
Aioi	Local	Kamigōri
Aioi	Special Rapid	Kamigōri

== History ==
Une Station was opened on 10 July 1890. With the privatization of Japanese National Railways (JNR) on 1 April 1987, the station came under the control of JR West.

== Passenger statistics ==
In fiscal 2019, the station was used by an average of 246 passengers daily

== Surrounding area ==
- Unehara / Tanaka Archaeological Park
- Japan National Route 2

== See also ==
- List of railway stations in Japan
