= Nishiawakura =

Nishiawakura 西粟倉村
- Village
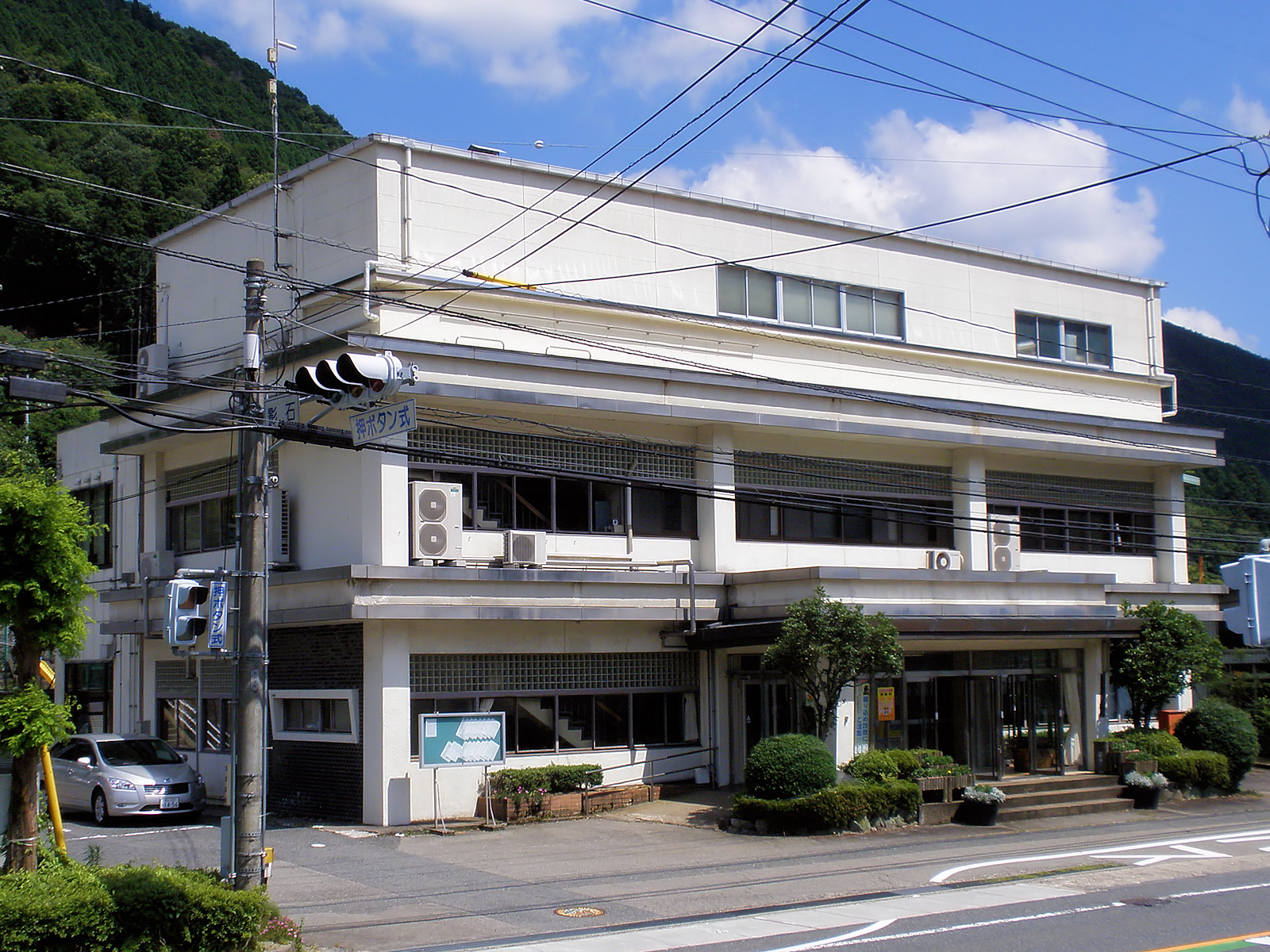
- Nishiawakura village office

- Flag Chapter
- Location of Nishiawakura in Okayama Prefecture

- Location in Japan
- Coordinates: 35°10′19″N 134°20′09″E
- Country: Japan
- Region: Chūgoku; San'yō
- Prefecture: Okayama
- District: Aida

Area
  - Total: 57.97 km^{2} (22.38 sq mi)

Population (February 1, 2023)
  - Total: 1,361
  - Density: 23.48/km^{2} (60.81/sq mi)
- Time zone: UTC+09:00 (JST)
- City hall address: 33-1 Kageishi, Nishiawakura-son, Aida-gun, Okayama-ken 707-0503
- Climate: Cfa
- Website: Official website
- Symbols
- Bird: Japanese Bush Warbler
- Flower: Rhododendron
- Tree: Cryptomeria

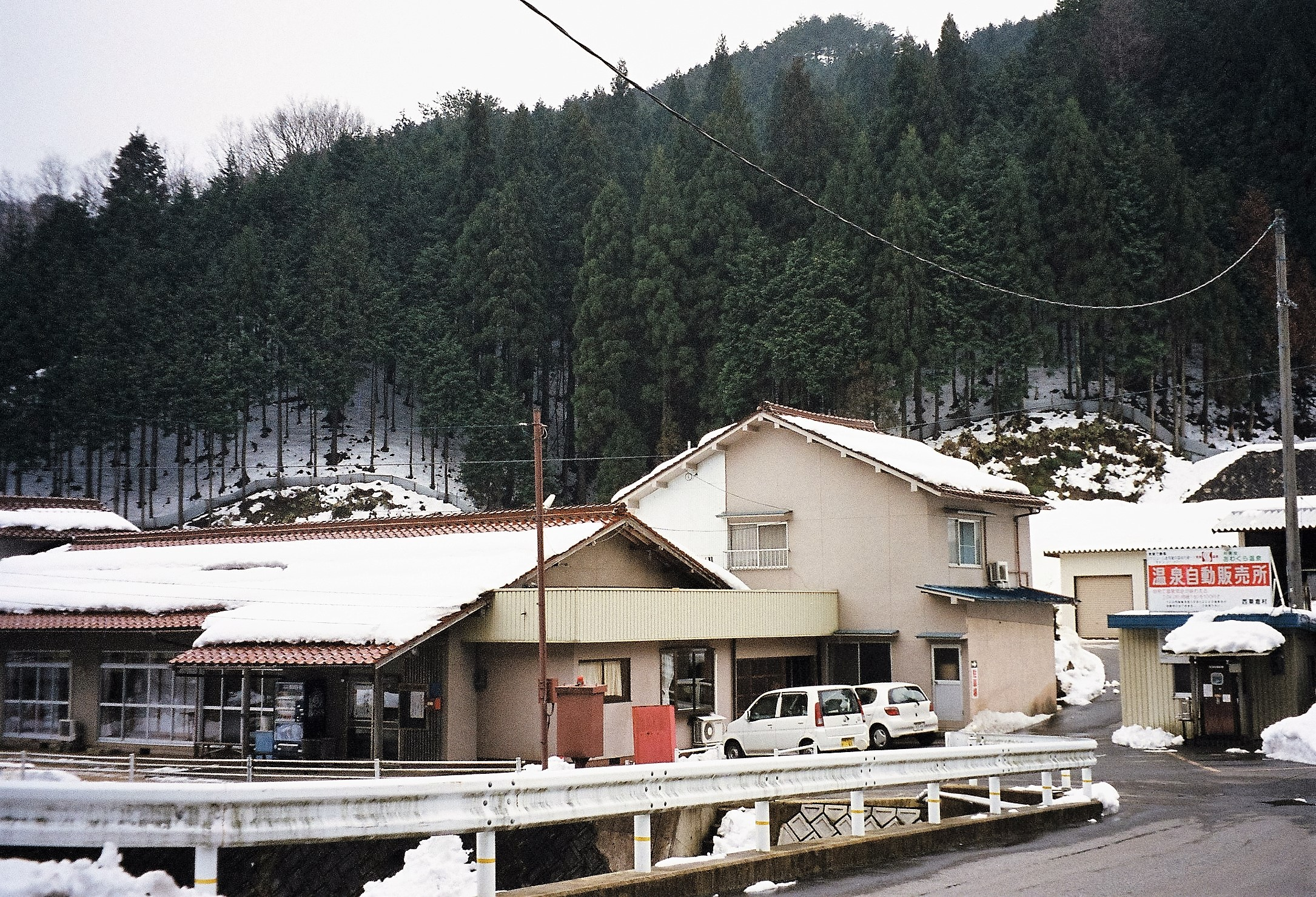
Awakura Onsen

Nishiawakura (西粟倉村, Nishiawakura-son) is a village located in Aida District, Okayama Prefecture, Japan.As of 1 February 2023, the village had an estimated population of 1,361 in 593 households and a population density of 29 persons per km². The total area of the village is 57.97 square kilometres (22.38 sq mi).

== Geography ==
Nishiawakura is located in the northeastern part of Okayama Prefecture, bordering Hyōgo Prefecture and Tottori Prefecture. Located on the southern side of the Chugoku Mountains, mountains and forests occupy 95% of the village area; and the village is designated as a heavy snowfall area.

=== Neighboring municipalities ===
Hyōgo Prefecture

- Shisō

Okayama Prefecture

- Mimasaka

Tottori Prefecture

- Chizu
- Wakasa

== Climate ==
Nishiawakura has a humid subtropical climate (Köppen Cfa) characterized by warm summers and cool winters with moderate snowfall. The average annual temperature in Nishiawakura is 11.9 °C. The average annual rainfall is 1981 mm with September as the wettest month. The temperatures are highest on average in August, at around 23.8 °C, and lowest in January, at around 0.1 °C.

== Demography ==
Per Japanese census data, the population of Nishiawakura has been as follows. The population has been steadily declining since the 1950s.

Historical population
Year	Pop.	±%
1920	2,620	—
1930	2,384	−9.0%
1940	2,305	−3.3%
1950	3,040	+31.9%
1960	2,714	−10.7%
1970	2,014	−25.8%
1980	1,923	−4.5%
1990	1,939	+0.8%
2000	1,831	−5.6%
2010	1,520	−17.0%

== History ==
Nishiawakura is part of ancient Mimasaka Province. After the Meiji restoration, the area was organized into Nishiawakura village, Yoshino District, Okayama Prefecture with the creation of the modern municipalities system on June 1,1889. Yoshino District was merged into Aida District, Okayama on April 1,1900.

== Government ==
Nishiawakura has a mayor-council form of government with a directly elected mayor and a unicameral village council ten members. Nishiawakura, collectively with the city of Mimasaka, contributes one member to the Okayama Prefectural Assembly. In terms of national politics, the village is part of the Okayama 3rd district of the lower house of the Diet of Japan.

== Economy ==
The main industry in the area is forestry and woodworking.

== Education ==
Nishiawakura has one public elementary school and one public junior high school operated by the town government. The village does not have a high school.

== Transportation ==
=== Railway ===
Chizu Express - Chizu Line

- Nishi-Awakura - Awakura-Onsen

=== Highways ===
- Tottori Expressway
- National Route 373

== Notable people from Nishiawakura ==
- Seiji Hagiwara, politician of the Liberal Democratic Party
