= Super Hakuto =

Japanese limited express train service

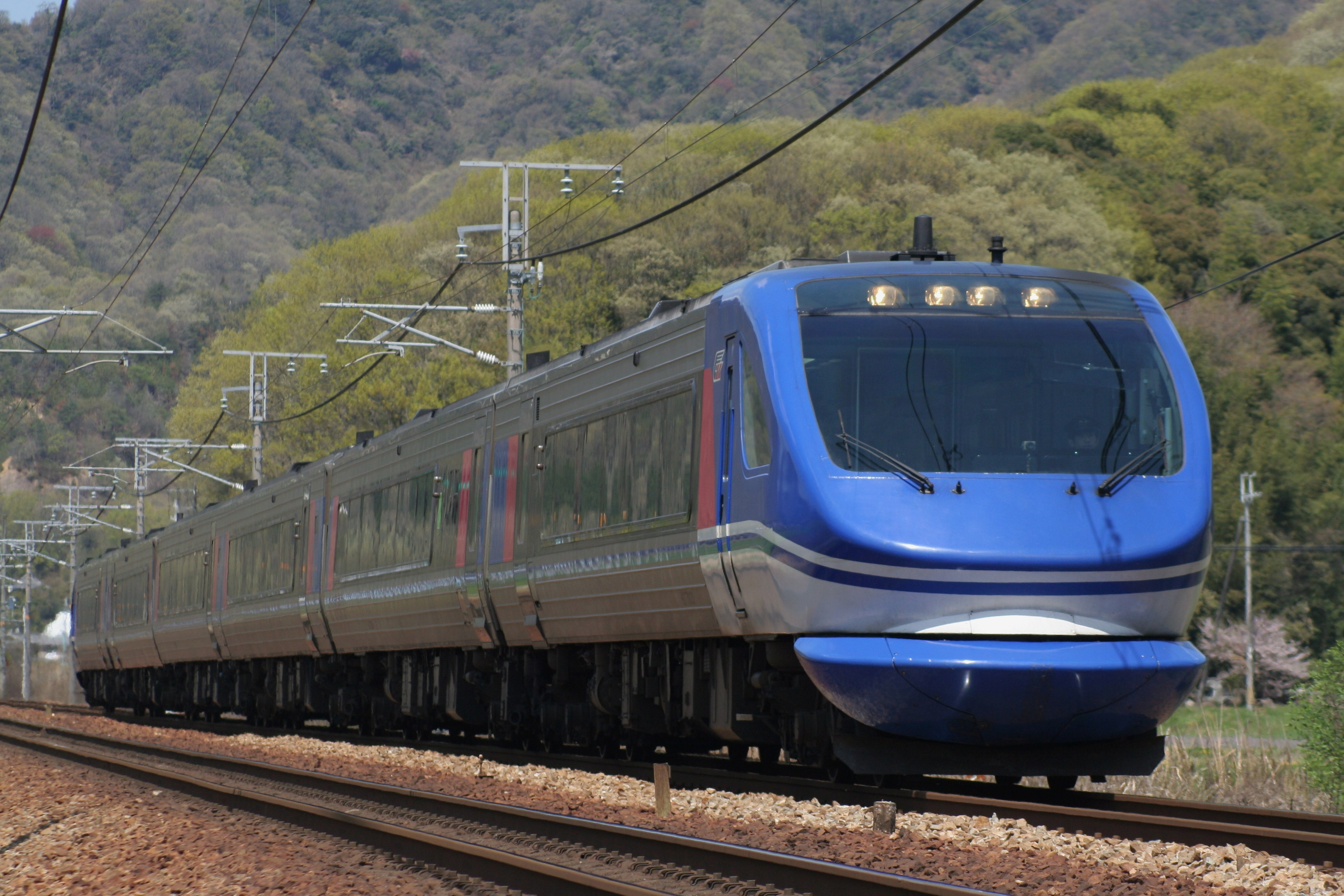
- A HOT7000 series DMU on a Super Hakuto service, April 2010

Overview
- Service type: Limited express
- Status: Operational
- Locale: Tokaido Main Line, Sanyo Main Line, Chizu Express Chizu Line, Inbi Line, Sanin Main Line
- First service: 3 December 1994
- Current operators: Chizu Express, JR West

Route
- Termini: Kyōto; Kurayoshi
- Stops: 17
- Distance travelled: 254.0 km (157.8 mi) (Kyoto - Tottori); 293.2 km (182.2 mi) (Kyoto - Kurayoshi)
- Average journey time: 3 hours - 3 hours 30 minutes
- Service frequency: 7 return workings daily

On-board services
- Class: Standard + Green
- Disabled access: Yes
- Sleeping arrangements: None
- Catering facilities: None
- Observation facilities: None
- Entertainment facilities: None
- Other facilities: Toilet, smoking room

Technical
- Rolling stock: HOT7000 series DMUs
- Track gauge: 1,067 mm (3 ft 6 in)
- Electrification: Diesel
- Operating speed: 130 km/h (81 mph)
- Track owners: JR West, Chizu Express

The Super Hakuto (スーパーはくと) is a limited express train service in Japan operated by the third-sector railway operator Chizu Express and West Japan Railway Company (JR West), which runs between Kyoto and Kurayoshi in Tottori Prefecture at a maximum speed of 130 kilometres per hour (81 mph).

== Stops ==
Trains stop at the following stations:

Kyōto – Shin-Ōsaka – Ōsaka – Sannomiya – (Kōbe) – Akashi – (Nishi-Akashi) – (Kakogawa) – Himeji – (Aioi) – Kamigōri – Sayo – Ōhara – Chizu – Kōge – Tottori – (Kurayoshi)

Stations in brackets () are stations where not all trains stop at.

- Only Super Hakuto no 13 stops at Kōbe, Nishi-Akashi, and Kakogawa
- Only Super Hakuto no 1 and 3 stop at Aioi
- Super Hakuto no 9 and 13 terminate at Tottori

== Rolling stock ==
=== Super Hakuto ===
- HOT7000 series tilting DMUs (since 3 December 1994)

=== Hakuto ===
- KiHa 181 series DMUs (3 December 1994 - November 1997)
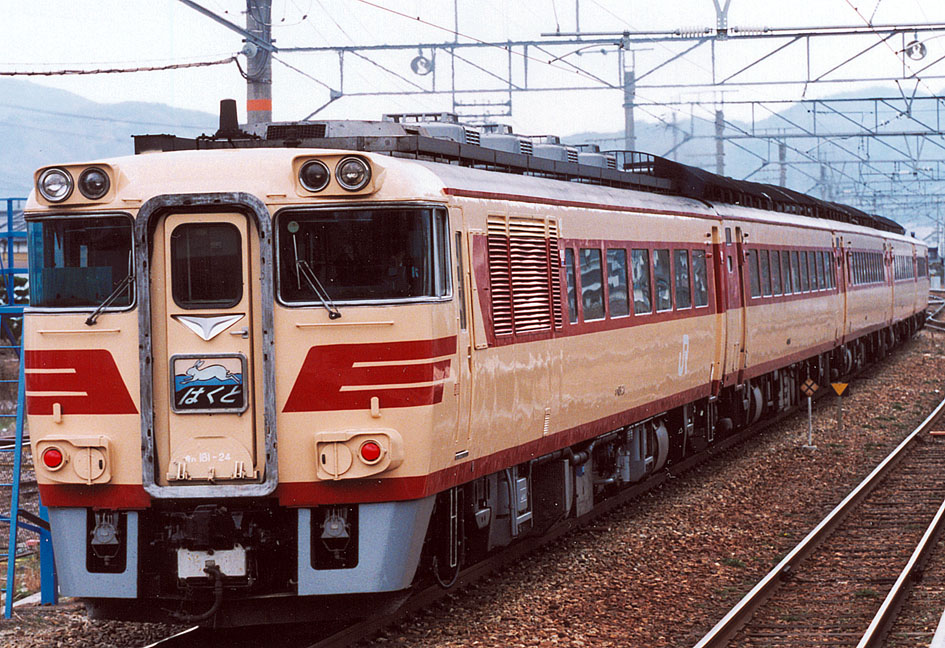
KiHa 181 series DMU on a Hakuto service

== Formation ==
Services are normally formed of five-car HOT7000 series sets, as shown below, with car 5 at the Kyoto end. All cars are non-smoking, although cars 1 and 5 have smoking rooms.

Car No.	1	2	3	4		5
Numbering	HOT7010	HOT7030	HOT7040	HOT7050		HOT7000
Accommodation	Non-reserved	Non-reserved	Reserved	Reserved	Green	Reserved
Facilities	Smoking room	Toilet	Universal access toilet	Toilet		Smoking room

- Car 5 is sometimes replaced by a HOT7020 car with a gangwayed cab end.

== History ==
Super Hakuto services commenced on 3 December 1994. Initially, Hakuto services using JR West KiHa 181 series DMUs were also operated over the same route, but these were discontinued from November 1997, from which date all six return services daily became Super Hakuto operating at a maximum speed of 130 km/h.

All cars were made non-smoking from 1 June 2008, from which time smoking rooms were added to cars 1 and 5.
