= Chizu Express HOT7000 series =

Japanese train type

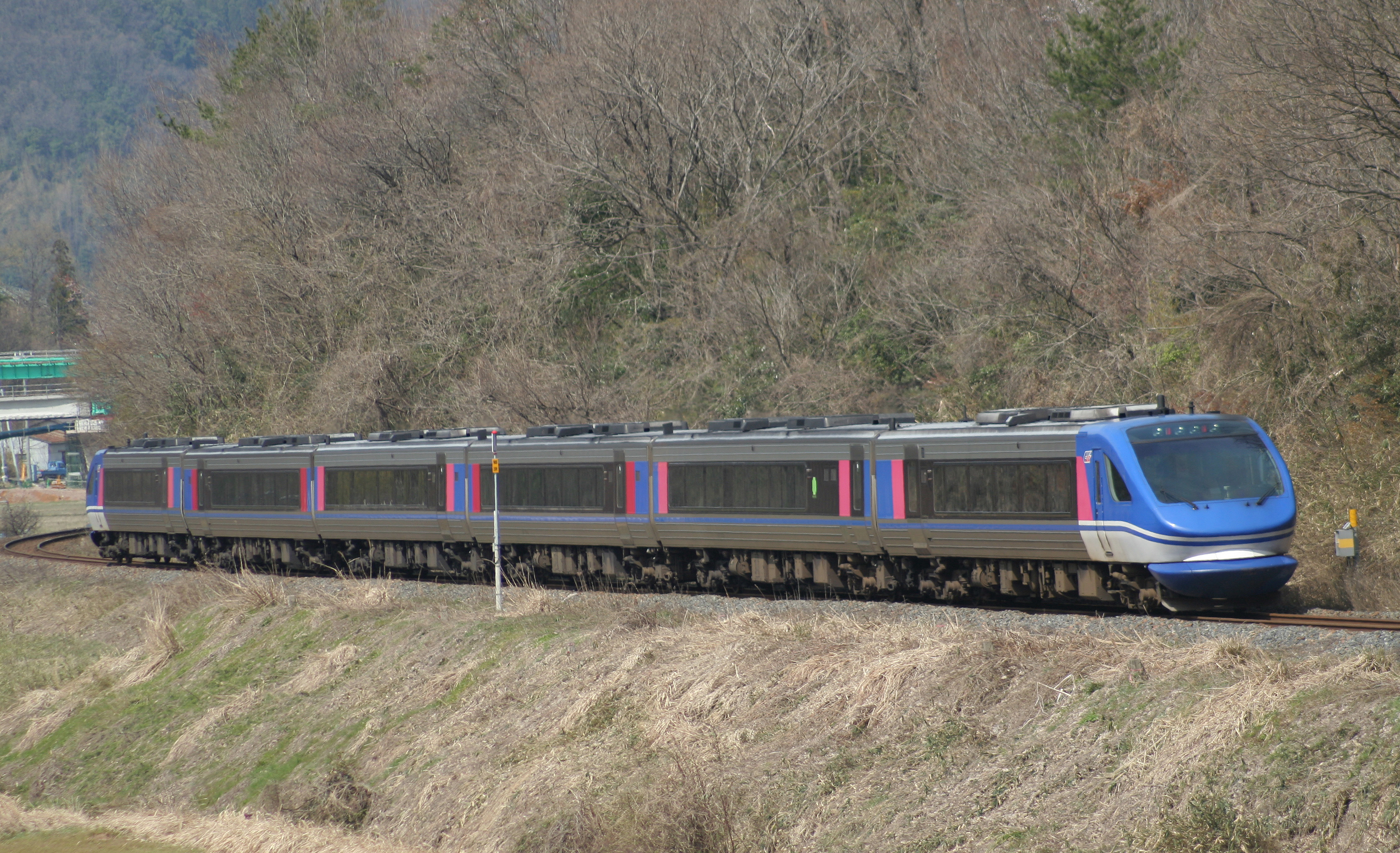
- A HOT7000 series six-car formation on a Super Hakuto service on the Inbi Line in April 2009
- In service: 3 December 1994 – Present
- Manufacturer: Fuji Heavy Industries
- Refurbished: 2007 - 2009, 2016
- Number built: 34 vehicles
- Number in service: 34 vehicles
- Formation: 5 or 6 cars per trainset
- Operators: Chizu Express, JR West
- Depots: Yonago
- Lines served: Tōkaidō Main Line, Sanyō Main Line, Chizu Express Chizu Line, Inbi Line, Sanin Main Line

Specifications
- Car body construction: Stainless steel
- Car length: 20,800 mm (68 ft 3 in)
- Width: 2,845 mm (9 ft 4.0 in)
- Height: 3,440 mm (11 ft 3 in)
- Doors: One plug door per side
- Maximum speed: 130 km/h (80 mph)
- Prime mover(s): 355 hp x 2 per car
- Bogies: FU46AD, FU46BD
- Safety system(s): ATS-SW, ATS-P
- Track gauge: 1,067 mm (3 ft 6 in)

The Chizu Express HOT7000 series (智頭急行HOT7000系) is a diesel multiple unit (DMU) tilting train type operated by the third-sector operating company Chizu Express and West Japan Railway Company (JR West) on Super Hakuto limited express services between Kyoto, Tottori, and Kurayoshi in Japan since December 1994.

The designation "HOT" is derived from the initials of the three prefectures along the route served: Hyogo Prefecture, Okayama Prefecture, and Tottori Prefecture.

== Formation ==
Trains are normally formed as five-car sets, sometimes lengthened to six cars.

== History ==
The first trains entered service on 3 December 1994.

Smoking compartments were added to cars 1 and 5 from 1 June 2008.
