= Suwa Shrine (Tottori) =

Shinto shrine in Tottori Prefecture, Japan

Suwa Jinja (諏訪神社)
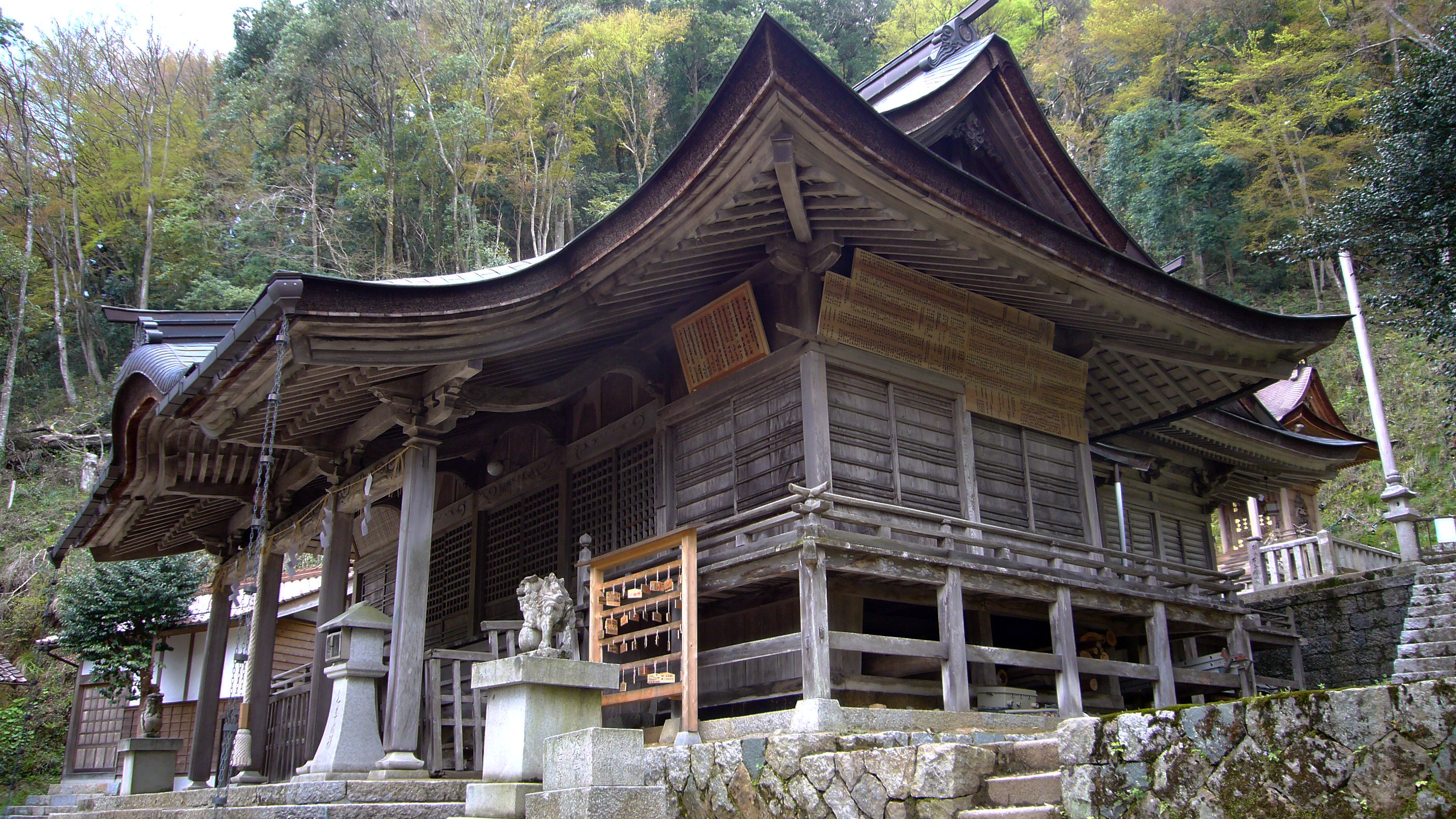
- Suwa Jinja in Chizu

- Location within Japan

Religion
- Affiliation: Shinto

Location
- Interactive map of Suwa Jinja (諏訪神社)
- Coordinates: 35°16′16″N 134°13′53″E

Suwa Jinja (諏訪神社) is a Shinto shrine in Chizu, Tottori Prefecture, Japan. Known from the time of the Mongol invasions, the shrine is celebrated for its Zelkova and momiji. The Honden dates to 1832. The Onbashira Festival, held in the Year of the Tiger and Year of the Rooster, sees pillars of Japanese cedar carried through the town.

== See also ==
- Matsuri
- Suwa Shrine (disambiguation)
- Suwa Taisha
