= Mitaki Dam =

Dam in Tottori Prefecture, Japan

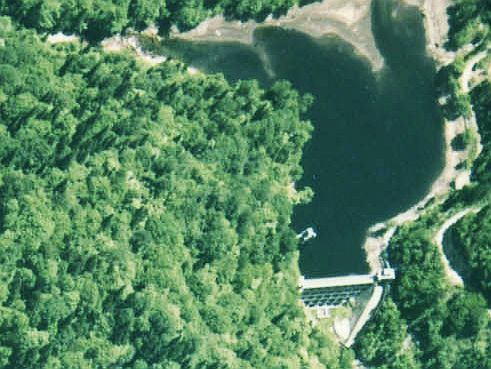
- Mitaki Dam photographed in 1974

- Location within Japan
- Location: Tottori Prefecture, Japan
- Coordinates: 35°16′17″N 134°19′58″E
- Opening date: 1936

Dam and spillways
- Height: 23.8 m (78 ft)
- Length: 82.5 m (271 ft)

Reservoir
- Total capacity: 178 thousand cubic meters
- Catchment area: 22.2 sq. km
- Surface area: 3 hectares

Mitaki Dam is a buttress dam located in Tottori prefecture in Japan. The dam is used for power production. The catchment area of the dam is 22.2 km^{2}. The dam impounds about 3 ha of land when full and can store 178 thousand cubic meters of water. The construction of the dam was completed in 1936.
