= Ōhara Station (Okayama) =

Railway station in Mimasaka, Okayama Prefecture, Japan

Ōhara Station 大原駅
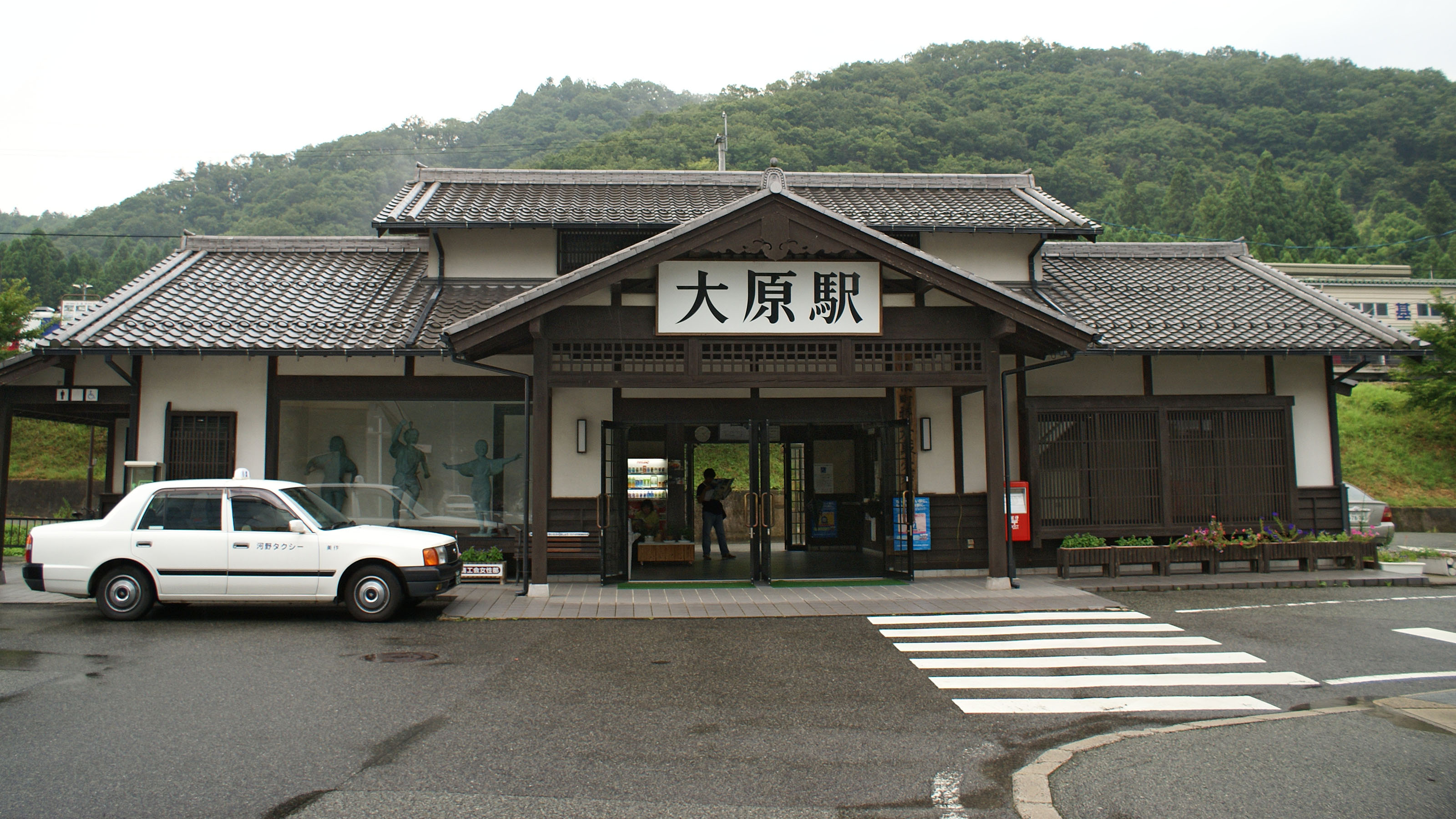
- Ōhara Station in August 2006

General information
- Location: 1494-24 Furumachi, Mimasaka-shi, Okayama-ken 707-0412; Japan
- Coordinates: 35°7′26″N 134°19′40.2″E
- Operator: Chizu Express
- Line: ■ Chizu Express Chizu Line
- Distance: 33.2 km (20.6 miles) from Kamigōri
- Platforms: 1 side + 1 island platform
- Tracks: 3
- Connections: Bus stop

Other information
- Status: Unstaffed
- Website: Official website

History
- Opened: 3 December 1994

Passengers
- FY2018: 92 daily
Location
- Location within Okayama Prefecture Location within Japan

Ōhara Station (大原駅, Ōhara-eki) is a passenger railway station located in the city of Mimasaka, Okayama Prefecture, Japan. It is operated by the third-sector semi-public railway operator Chizu Express.

== Lines ==
Ōhara Station is served by the Chizu Line and is 33.2 kilometers from the terminus of the line at Kamigōri. It is the only station in the Okayama Prefecture section of the Chizu Express where limited express trains stop, and the ``Super Hakuto that connects Keihanshin and Tottori, and the ``Super Inaba that connects Okayama City, the prefectural capital, and Tottori, also stop here. The "Victory Hakuto" train, which runs on the day of the Tottori University's second exam, also stops at this station.

== Station layout ==
The station is composed of one side platform and one island platform serving three tracks, located on an embankment. There is a station building on the west side of the embankment, and a staffed ticket window, but it is possible to enter and exit the platform without going through the station building. Therefore, boarding and alighting of local trains is handled in the same way as unstaffed stations, issuing a numbered ticket when boarding, and inserting the ticket and fare into the fare box inside the train when getting off. In the case of a limited express train, insert the passenger ticket/limited express ticket into the ticket box provided near the exit. This station has the Ōhara depot that manages cars for local trains. Because the handling of trains is complicated, the departure and arrival platforms are not fixed, but the limited express trains generally depart from Platform 2. Since the effective length of Platform 1 is shorter than the other platforms, it only services local trains.

=== Platforms ===
1, 2, 3	■ Chizu Line	for Chizu, Tottori and Kurayoshi} for Kamigori, Osaka, Kyoto and Okayama

== Adjacent stations ==
«	Service	»
Chizu Express Chizu Line
Miyamoto-Musashi	Local	Nishi-Awakura
Sayo	Limited Express Super Hakuto	Chizu
Sayo	Limited Express Super Inaba	Chizu

== History ==
Ōhara Station opened on December 3, 1994 with the opening of the Chizu Line.

== Passenger statistics ==
In fiscal 2018, the station was used by an average of 92 passengers daily.

== Surrounding area ==
- Ohara-juku - Okayama Prefecture Designated Townscape Preservation District
- Mimasaka City Hall Ohara General Branch
- Mimasaka Municipal Ohara Junior High School
- Mimasaka Municipal Ohara Elementary School
- National Route 373
- National Route 429

== See also ==
- List of railway stations in Japan
