= Chizu Station =

Railway station in Tottori Prefecture, Japan

Chizu Station 智頭駅
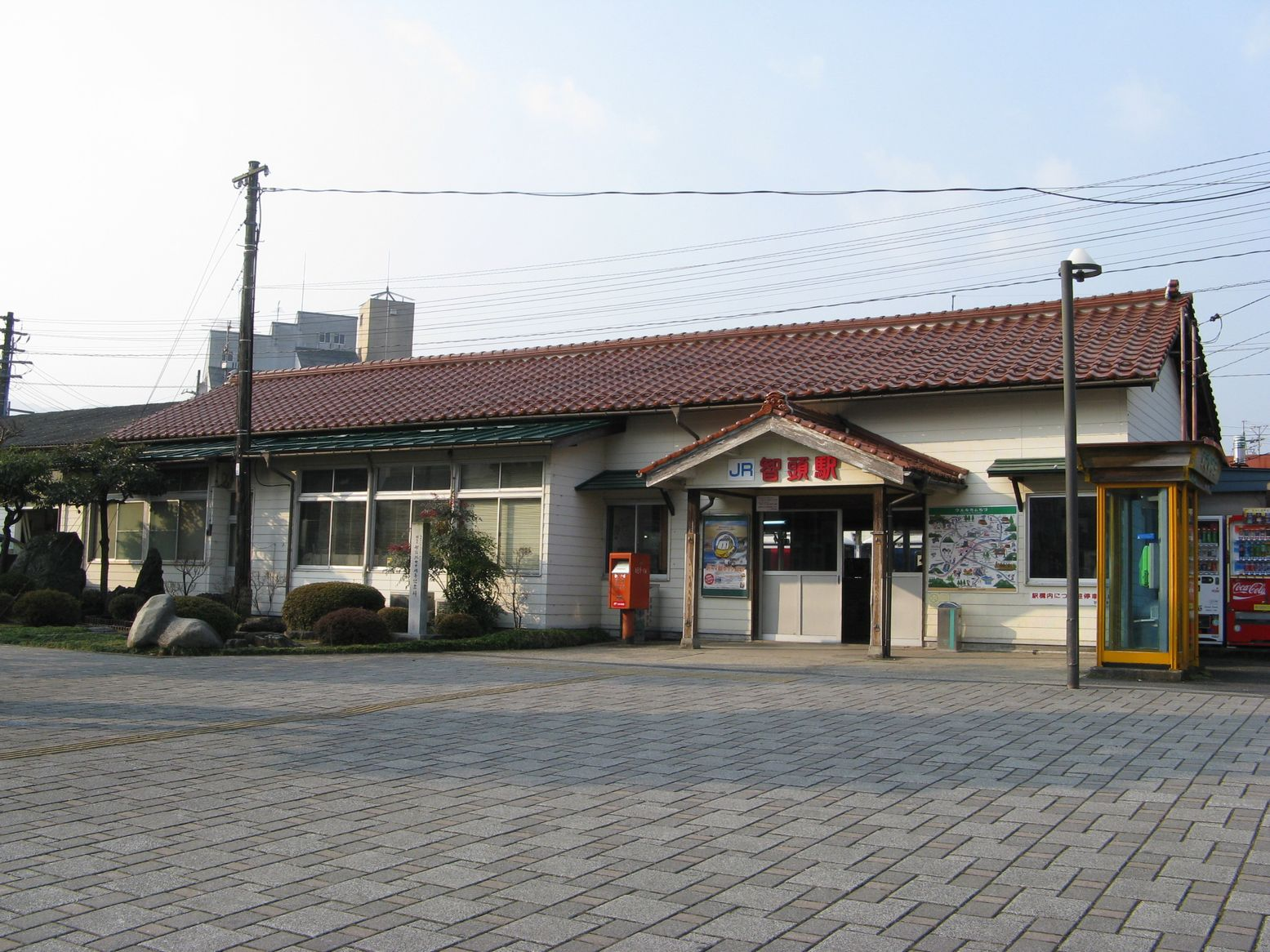
- Chizu Station, January 2008

General information
- Location: 1858-1 Chizu Rokujizono, Chizu-cho, Yazu-gun, Tottori-ken 689-1402; Japan
- Coordinates: 35.2647°N 134.2250°E
- Operator: JR West; Chizu Express
- Lines: Inbi Line; ■ Chizu Line
- Platforms: 2 island + 1 side platforms

Other information
- Status: Staffed (Midori no Madoguchi)
- Website: Official website

History
- Opened: 5 June 1923

Passengers
- FY2017: 2911 daily (JR); 118 (daily) Chizu Express
Location
- Location within Tottori Prefecture Location within Japan

Chizu Station (智頭駅, Chizu-eki) is a junction passenger railway station located in the town of Chizu, Yazu District, Tottori, Japan, jointly operated by the West Japan Railway Company (JR West) and the third sector railway operator Chizu Express.

== Lines ==
Chizu Station is served by the Inbi Line, and is located 31.9 kilometers from the terminus of the line at Tottori. It is also served by the Chizu Express Chizu Line and is 56.1kilometers from the terminus of that line at Kamigōri Station.

== Station layout ==
The JR station has one side platform and one island platform connected by a footbridge. The station has a Midori no Madoguchi staffed ticket office. The Chizu Express station has one island platform, also connected to its station building by a footbridge.

=== Platforms ===
1	■ ■ Chizu Express Chizu Line	for Kamigōri and Osaka, Kyoto, Okayama
2, 3	■ Inbi Line	for Tottori and Kurayoshi; Tsuyama

1, 2	■ ■ Chizu Express Chizu Line	for Kamigōri

== Adjacent stations ==
«	Service	»
JR West Inbi Line
Kōge	Limited Express Super Hakuto	Chizu Line
Kōge	Limited Express Super Inaba	Chizu Line
Terminus	Rapid	Haji
Inaba-Yashiro	Local	Haji
Chizu Express Chizu Line
Koi-Yamagata	Local	Terminus
Ohara	Limited Express Super Hakuto	Inbi Line
Ohara	Limited Express Super Inaba	Inbi Line

== History ==
Chizu Station opened on 5 June 1923. The additional Chizu Express platforms entered service on 3 December 1994.

== Passenger statistics ==
In fiscal 2017, the JR portion of the station was used by an average of 2,911 passengers daily, and the Chizu Express portion by 118 passengers daily.

== Surrounding area ==
- Chizu Town Office
- Chizu Town Tourism Association
- National Health Insurance Chizu Hospital

== See also ==
- List of railway stations in Japan
