= Akō District =

District in Hyogo Prefecture, Japan

Coordinates: 34°52′N 134°21′E

Akō district.

Akō (赤穂郡, Akō-gun) is a district located in Hyōgo Prefecture, Japan.

As of 2003, the district has an estimated population of 18,014 and a density of 119.87 persons per km^{2}. The total area is 150.28 km^{2}.

== Towns and villages ==
- Kamigōri
