= Kamigōri Station =

Railway station in Kamigōri, Hyōgo Prefecture, Japan

Kamigōri Station 上郡駅
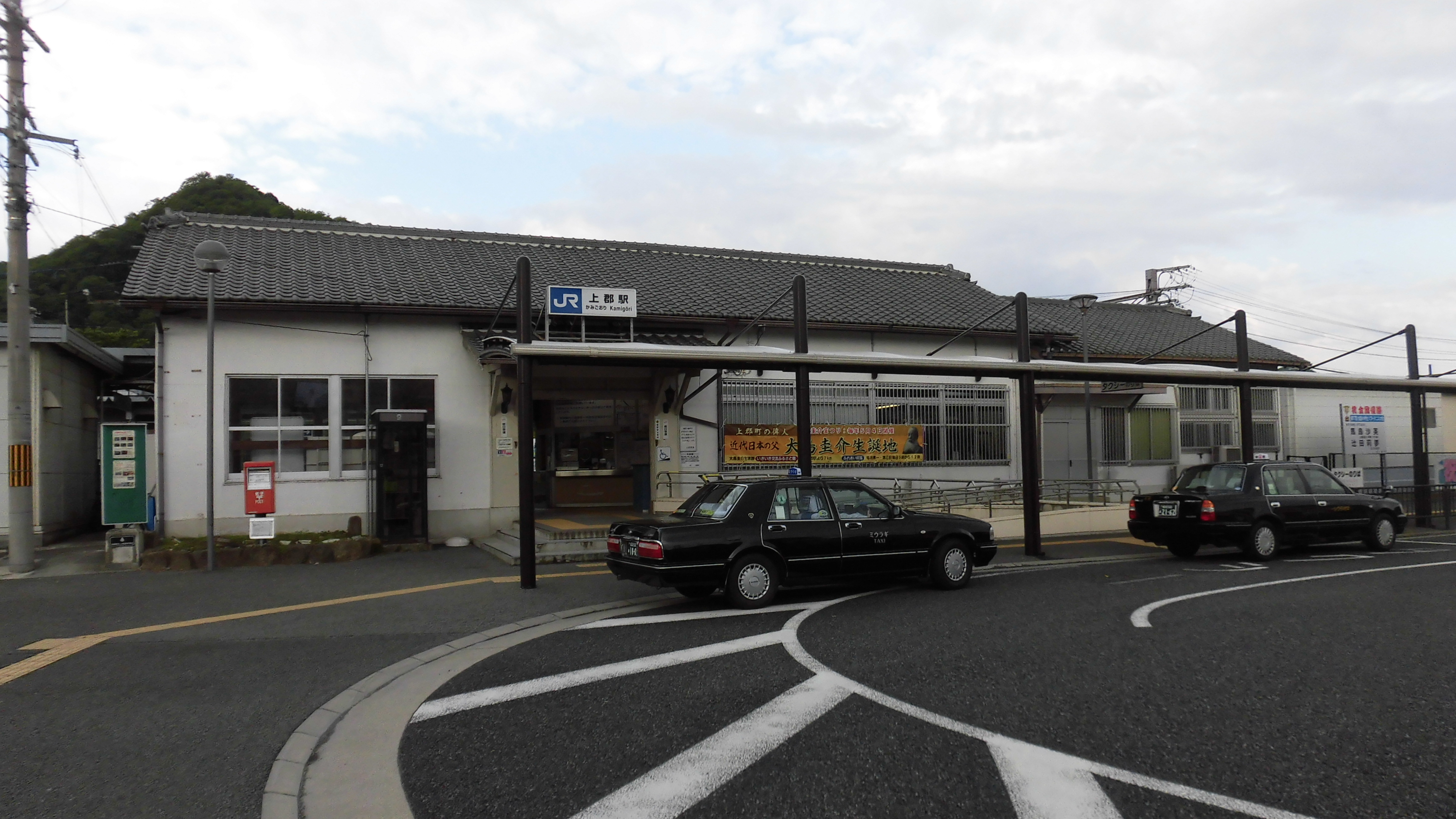
- Kamigōri Station, May 2018

General information
- Location: Daimochi, Kamigōri-chō, Akō-gun, Hyōgo-ken 667-0126; Japan
- Coordinates: 34.8659155°N 134.3542957°E
- Owner: West Japan Railway Company
- Operator: West Japan Railway Company; Chizu Express
- Lines: San'yō Main Line; ■ Chizu Express Chizu Line
- Distance: 89.6 km (55.7 miles) from Himeji
- Platforms: 2 island platforms
- Connections: Bus stop

Other information
- Status: Staffed
- Website: Official website

History
- Opened: 4 April 1895

Passengers
- FY2019: 3001 daily (JR)
Location
- Location within Hyōgo Prefecture Location within Japan

Kamigōri Station (上郡駅, Kamigōri-eki) is an interchange passenger railway station located in the town of Kamigōri, Akō District, Hyōgo Prefecture, Japan, operated jointly by West Japan Railway Company (JR West) and the third-sector (semi-public) railway operator Chizu Express.

== Lines ==
Kamigōri Station is served by the JR San'yō Main Line, and is located 89.6 kilometers from the terminus of the line at Kobe and 122.7 kilometers from Osaka. It is also the western terminus of the Chizu Line and is 56.1 kilometers from the opposing terminus of the line at Chizu.

== Station layout ==
The station consists of two ground-level island platforms connected to the station building by a footbridge. The side of the island platform closest to the station is not used, and one side of the island platform on the opposite side of the station building has a dead-head cutout for use by the Chizu Line. The station is staffed.

=== Platforms ===
1	■ San'yō Main Line	for Himeji and Osaka
2	■ San'yō Main Line	for Himeji, Osaka for Tottori and Okayama (Express Super Inaba)
3	■ San'yō Main Line	for Okayama and Mihara for Tottori and Kurayoshi (Express Super Inaba)

■ ■ Chizu Express Chizu Line	for Ōhara and Chizu

== Adjacent stations ==
«	Service	»
JR West
Sanyō Main Line
Aioi or Himeji	Limited Express Super Hakuto	Chizu Line
Chizu Line	Limited Express Super Inaba	Okayama
Une	Special Rapid	Terminus
Une	Local	Mitsuishi
Chizu Express
Chizu Line
Terminus	Local	Kokenawa
Sanyō Main Line	Limited Express Super Hakuto	Sayo
Sanyō Main Line	Limited Express Super Inaba	Sayo

== History ==
Kamigōri Station opened on April 4, 1895. With the privatization of the Japan National Railways (JNR) on April 1, 1987, the station came under the aegis of the West Japan Railway Company.

== Passenger statistics ==
In fiscal 2019, the JR portion of the station was used by an average of 3001 passengers daily The Chizu Railway portion of the station was used by 498 passengers in fiscal 2017.

== Surrounding area ==
- Kamigōri Town Hall
- Hyogo Prefectural Kamigori High School
- Kamigori Municipal Kamigori Junior High School
- Kamigori Municipal Yamanosato Elementary School

== See also ==
- List of railway stations in Japan
