= Mimasaka, Okayama (town) =

Mimasaka 美作町
- Former municipality
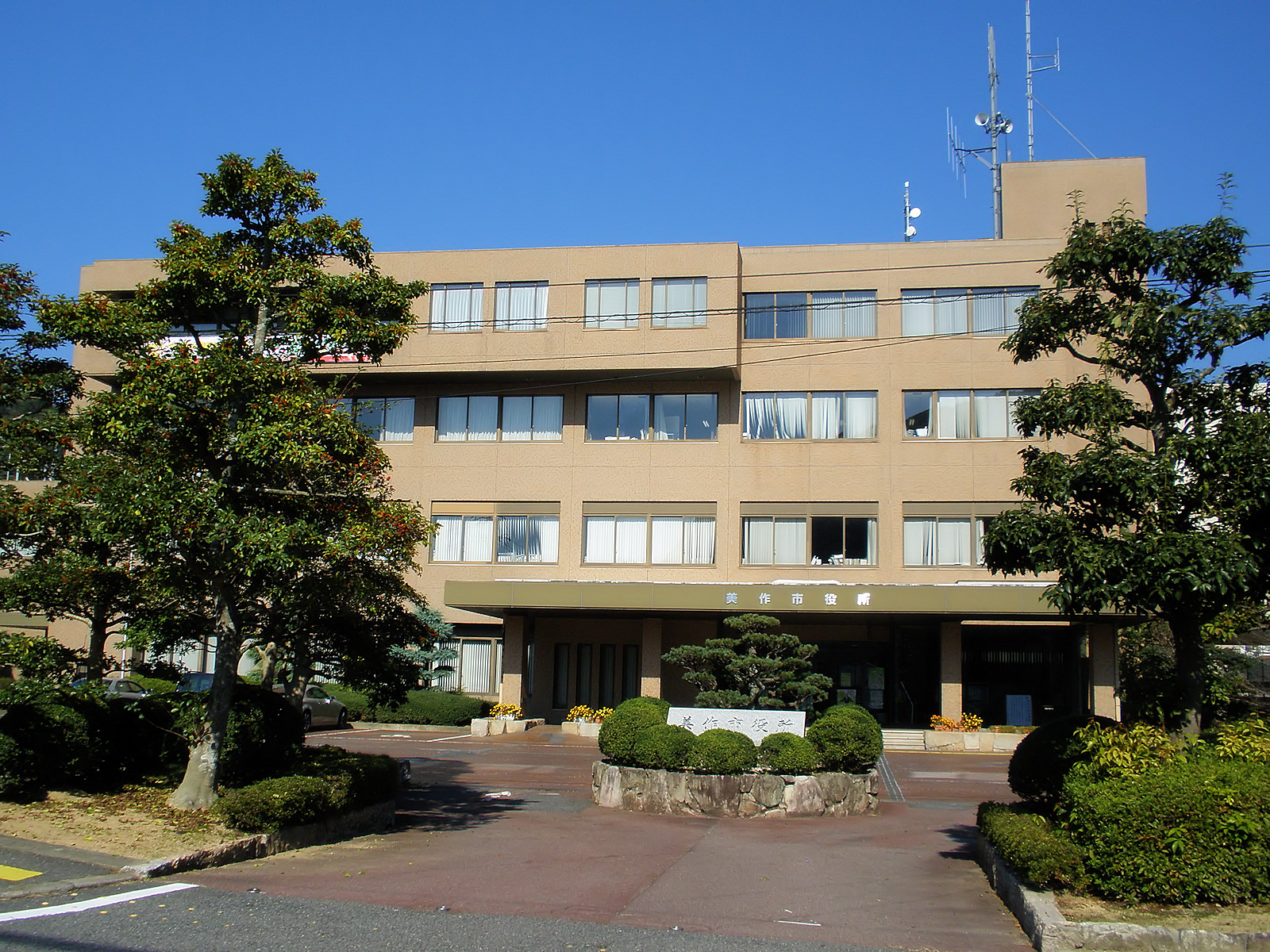
- Former Mimasaka town hall

- Location in Japan
- Coordinates: 35°0′30.95″N 134°8′55″E
- Country: Japan
- Region: Chūgoku
- Prefecture: Okayama Prefecture
- District: Aida
- Merged: March 31, 2005 (now part of Mimasaka)

Area
  - Total: 86.97 km^{2} (33.58 sq mi)

Population (October 2004)
  - Total: 12,856
  - Density: 147.82/km^{2} (382.9/sq mi)
- Time zone: UTC+09:00 (JST)
- Symbols
- Flower: Prunus mume Chrysanthemum
- Tree: Round Leaf Holly

Mimasaka (美作町, Mimasaka-chō) was a town located in Aida District, Okayama Prefecture, Japan.

As of October 2004, the town had an estimated population of 12,856 and a density of 147.82 persons per km^{2}. The total area was 86.97 km^{2}.

On March 31, 2005, Mimasaka absorbed the towns of Aida, Ōhara and Sakutō, the village of Higashiawakura (all from Aida District), and the town of Katsuta (from Katsuta District) to create the city of Mimasaka.

== Geography ==
=== Adjoining municipalities ===
- Okayama Prefecture
  - Shōō
  - Katsuta
  - Aida
  - Sakutō
  - Misaki

== Education ==
- Mimasaka-Daiichi Elementary School
- Mimasaka-Kita Elementary School
- Kose Elementary School (Closure in 2006)
- Toyota Elementary School (Closure in 2003)
- Mimasaka Junior High School
- Okayama Prefectural Hayashino High School

== Transportation ==
=== Railways ===
- West Japan Railway Company
  - Kishin Line
    - Narahara Station - Hayashino Station

=== Road ===
- Expressways:
  - Chūgoku Expressway
    - Narahara Parking Area - Mimasaka Interchange
- National highways:
  - Route 179
  - Route 374
- Prefectural roads:
  - Okayama Prefectural Route 51 (Mimasaka-Nagi)
  - Okayama Prefectural Route 349 (Kichigahara-Mimasaka)
  - Okayama Prefectural Route 354 (Mabashi-Hirafuku)
  - Okayama Prefectural Route 359 (Kashimura-Kanaya)
  - Okayama Prefectural Route 360 (Manzen-Mimasaka)
  - Okayama Prefectural Route 361 (Hataoki-Katsumada)
  - Okayama Prefectural Route 362 (Iden-Yūka)
  - Okayama Prefectural Route 379 (Dōdō-Kashimura)
  - Okayama Prefectural Route 388 (Magata-Mimasaka)
- Roadside Station
  - Saisai Chaya

== Notable places and events ==
- Yunogo Onsen
