= Katsuta, Okayama =

Katsuta 勝田町
- Town
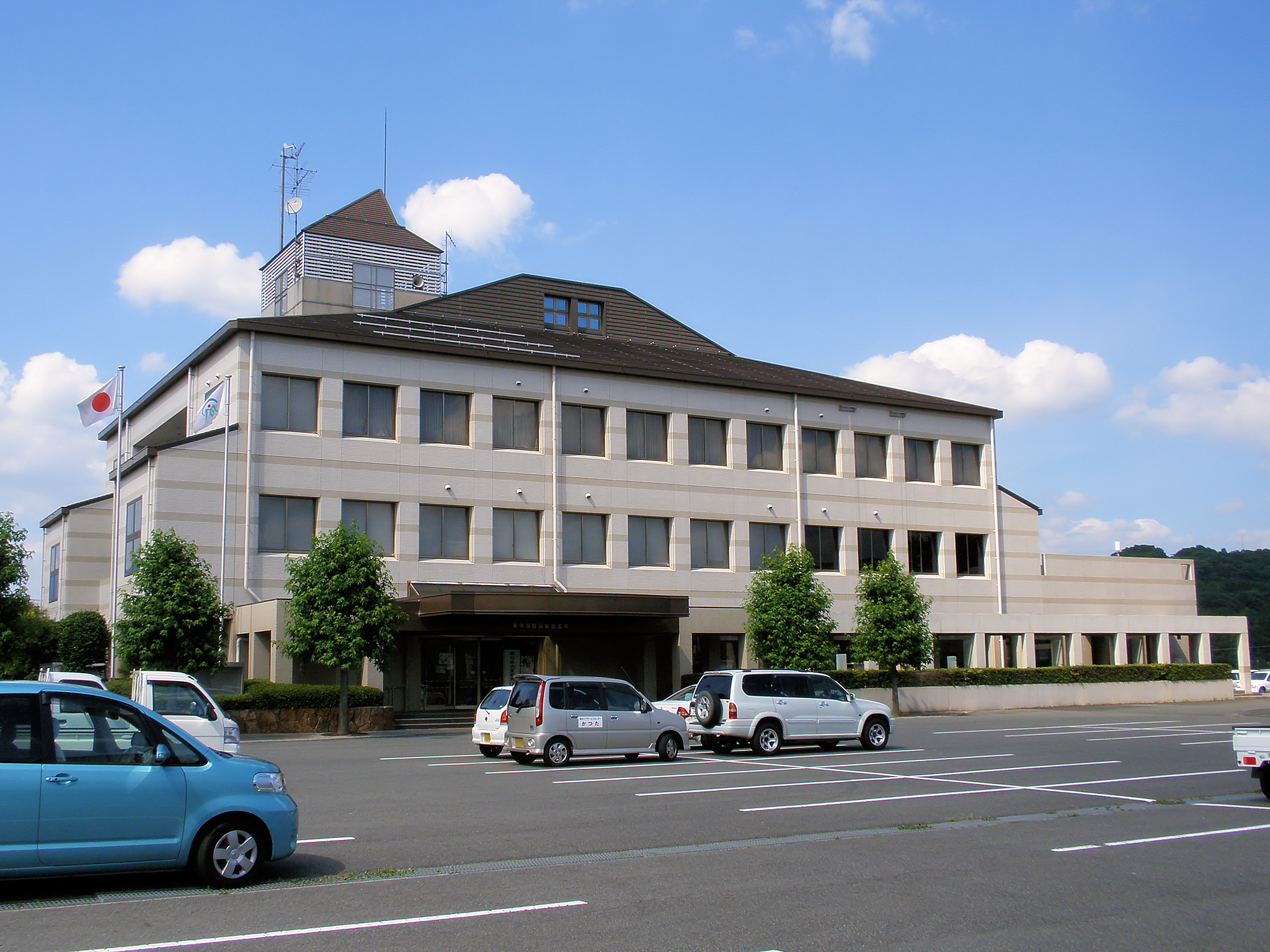
- Former Katsuta town hall

- Location in Japan
- Coordinates: 35°4′24.4″N 134°11′28.0″E
- Country: Japan
- Region: Chūgoku
- Prefecture: Okayama Prefecture
- District: Katsuta
- Merged: March 31, 2005 (now part of Mimasaka)

Area
  - Total: 87.29 km^{2} (33.70 sq mi)

Population (2003)
  - Total: 3,660
  - Density: 41.93/km^{2} (108.6/sq mi)
- Time zone: UTC+09:00 (JST)
- Symbols
- Flower: Lilium
- Tree: Cryptomeria japonica

Katsuta (勝田町, Katsuta-chō) was a town located in Katsuta District, Okayama Prefecture, Japan.

As of 2003, the town had an estimated population of 3,660 and a density of 41.93 persons per km^{2}. The total area was 87.29 km^{2}.

On March 31, 2005, Katsuta, along with the towns of Mimasaka (former), Aida, Ōhara and Sakutō, and the village of Higashiawakura (all from Aida District), was merged to create the city of Mimasaka.

== Geography ==
=== Adjoining municipalities ===
- Okayama Prefecture
  - Mimasaka (town)
  - Sakutō
  - Ōhara
  - Nishiawakura
  - Shōō
  - Nagi
- Tottori Prefecture
  - Wakasa

== Education ==
- Katsuta Elementary School
- Katsuta-Higashi Elementary School
- Kajinami Elementary School
- Katsuta Junior High School

== Transportation ==
=== Road ===
- National highways:
  - Route 429
- Prefectural roads:
  - Okayama Prefectural Route 7 (Chizu-Katsuta)
  - Okayama Prefectural Route 51 (Mimasaka-Nagi)
  - Okayama Prefectural Route 356 (Gyōhō-Katsuta)
  - Okayama Prefectural Route 357 (Kajinami-Tateishi)
  - Okayama Prefectural Route 388 (Magata-Mimasaka)
  - Okayama Prefectural Route 479 (Seto-Munakake)
