= List of cities in Okayama Prefecture by population =

The following list sorts all cities (including towns) in the Japanese prefecture of Okayama with a population of more than 5,000 according to the 2020 Census. As of October 1, 2020, 24 places fulfill this criterion and are listed here. This list refers only to the population of individual cities, towns and villages within their defined limits, which does not include other municipalities or suburban areas within urban agglomerations.

== List ==
The following table lists the 24 cities and towns in Okayama with a population of at least 5,000 on October 1, 2020, according to the 2020 Census. The table also gives an overview of the evolution of the population since the 1995 census.

Rank (2020)	Name	Status	1995	2000	2005	2010	2015	2020
1	Okayama	City	663,346	674,375	696,172	709,584	719,474	724,691
2	Kurashiki	City	453,618	460,869	469,377	475,513	477,118	474,592
3	Tsuyama	City	113,617	111,499	110,569	106,788	103,746	99,937
4	Sōja	City	65,437	66,201	66,584	66,201	66,855	69,030
5	Tamano	City	71,330	69,567	67,047	64,588	60,736	56,531
6	Kasaoka	City	60,478	59,300	57,272	54,225	50,568	46,088
7	Maniwa	City	56,607	54,747	51,782	48,964	46,124	42,725
8	Akaiwa	City	43,011	43,813	43,913	43,458	43,214	42,661
9	Ibara	City	47,647	46,489	45,104	43,927	41,390	38,384
10	Setouchi	City	39,228	39,403	39,081	37,852	36,975	36,048
11	Asakuchi	City	38,595	37,724	37,327	36,114	34,235	32,772
12	Bizen	City	44,855	42,534	40,241	37,839	35,179	32,320
13	Takahashi	City	43,115	41,077	38,799	34,963	32,075	29,072
14	Niimi	City	39,891	38,492	36,073	33,870	30,658	28,079
15	Mimasaka	City	36,140	34,577	32,479	30,498	27,977	25,939
16	Wake	Town	17,227	16,815	16,180	15,362	14,412	13,623
17	Yakage	Town	16,803	16,230	15,713	15,092	14,201	13,414
18	Misaki	Town	18,254	17,562	16,577	15,642	14,432	13,053
19	Hayashima	Town	11,562	11,915	11,921	12,214	12,154	12,368
20	Kagamino	Town	15,731	15,091	14,059	13,580	12,847	12,062
21	Satoshō	Town	10,583	10,782	10,823	10,916	10,929	10,950
22	Shōō	Town	11,669	11,428	11,263	11,195	11,125	10,888
23	Kibichūō	Town	15,507	14,651	14,040	13,033	11,950	10,886
24	Nagi	Town	7,230	6,690	6,475	6,085	5,906	5,578
