= Ōhara, Okayama =

Ōhara 大原町
- Former municipality
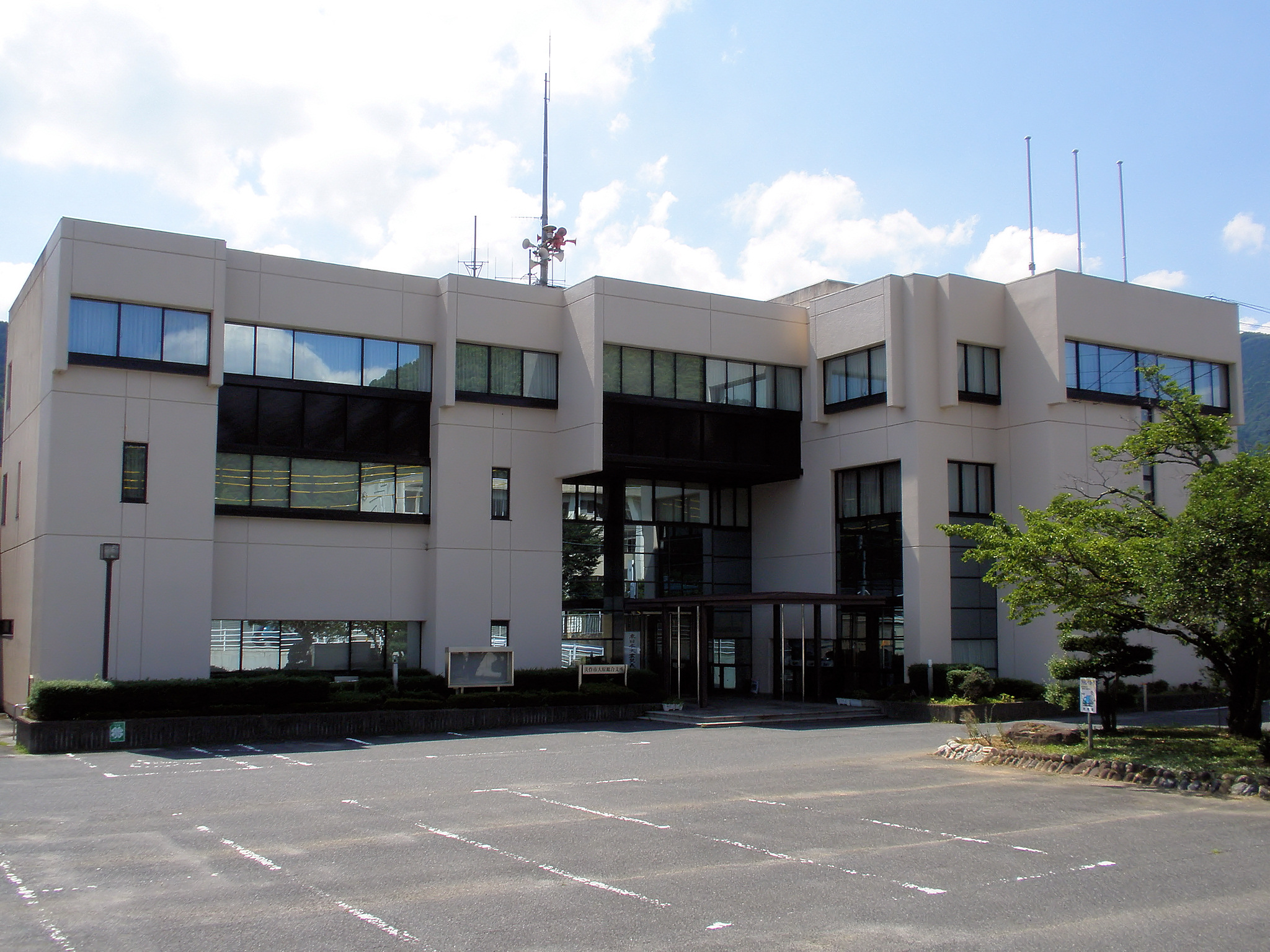
- Former Ōhara town hall

- Location in Japan
- Coordinates: 35°7′14.5″N 134°19′33.9″E
- Country: Japan
- Region: Chūgoku
- Prefecture: Okayama Prefecture
- District: Aida
- Merged: March 31, 2005 (now part of Mimasaka)

Area
  - Total: 54.48 km^{2} (21.03 sq mi)

Population (2003)
  - Total: 4,630
  - Density: 84.99/km^{2} (220.1/sq mi)
- Time zone: UTC+09:00 (JST)
- Symbols
- Flower: Lilium japonicum
- Tree: Zelkova serrata

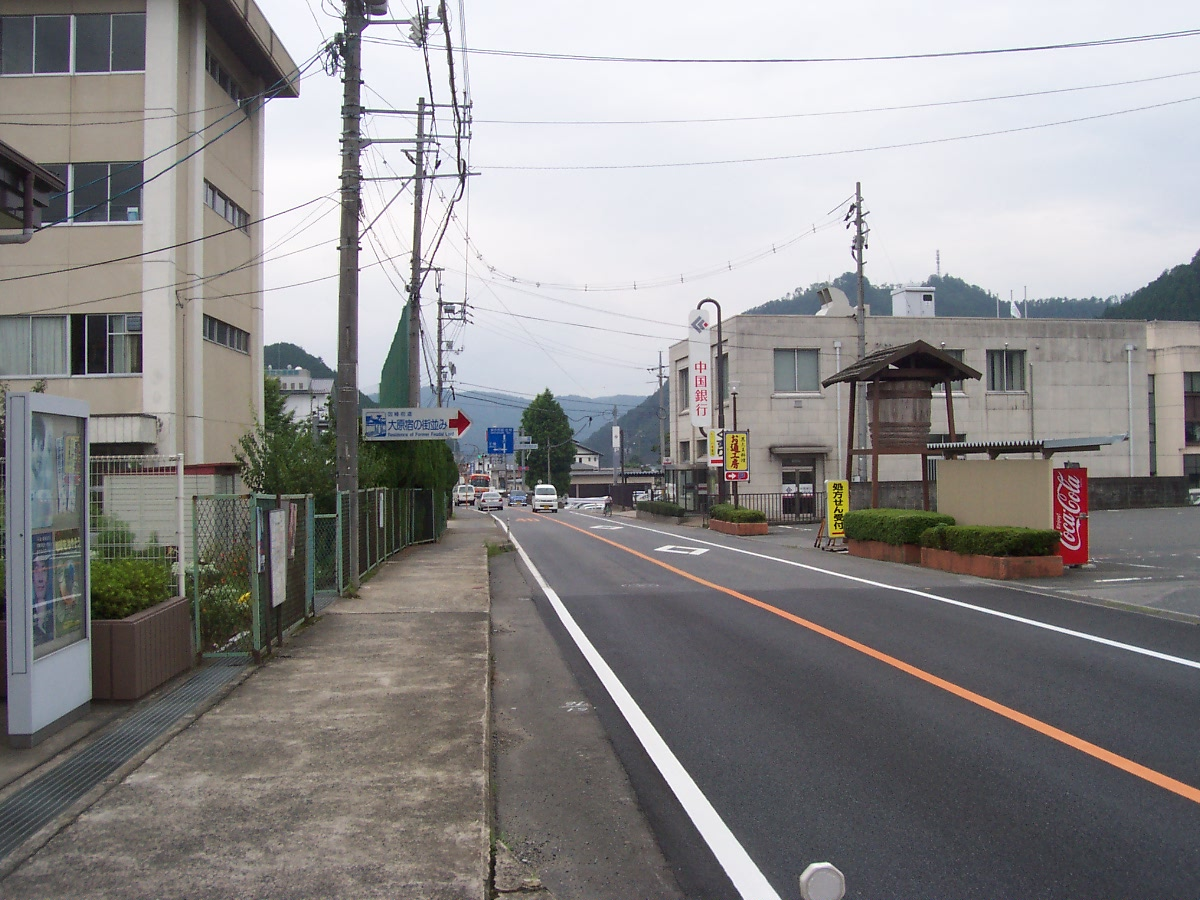
Central Ōhara

Ōhara (大原町, Ōhara-chō) was a town located in Aida District, Okayama Prefecture, Japan.

As of 2003, the town had an estimated population of 4,630 and a density of 84.99 persons per km^{2}. The total area was 54.48 km^{2}.

On March 31, 2005, Ōhara, along with the towns of Mimasaka, Aida and Sakutō, the village of Higashiawakura (all from Aida District), and the town of Katsuta (from Katsuta District), was merged to create the city of Mimasaka.

== Geography ==
=== Adjoining municipalities ===
- Okayama Prefecture
  - Sakutō
  - Nishiawakura
  - Higashiawakura
  - Katsuta
- Hyōgo Prefecture
  - Sayō

== Education ==
- Ōhara Elementary School
- Ōhara Junior High School
- Okayama Prefectural Ōhara High School (Closure in 2006)

== Transportation ==
=== Railways ===
- Chizu Express
  - Chizu Line
    - Miyamoto Musashi Station - Ōhara Station

=== Road ===
- National highways:
  - Route 373
  - Route 429
- Prefectural roads:
  - Okayama Prefectural Route 5 (Sakutō-Ōhara)
  - Okayama Prefectural Route 240 (Shimoshō-Sayō)
  - Okayama Prefectural Route 357 (Kajinami-Tateishi)

== Notable places and events ==
- Village of Miyamoto Musashi
- Main stone of Miyamoto Musashi Temple
- Miyamoto Musashi's grave next to that of his parents
- Ōhara-shuku (Shukuba)
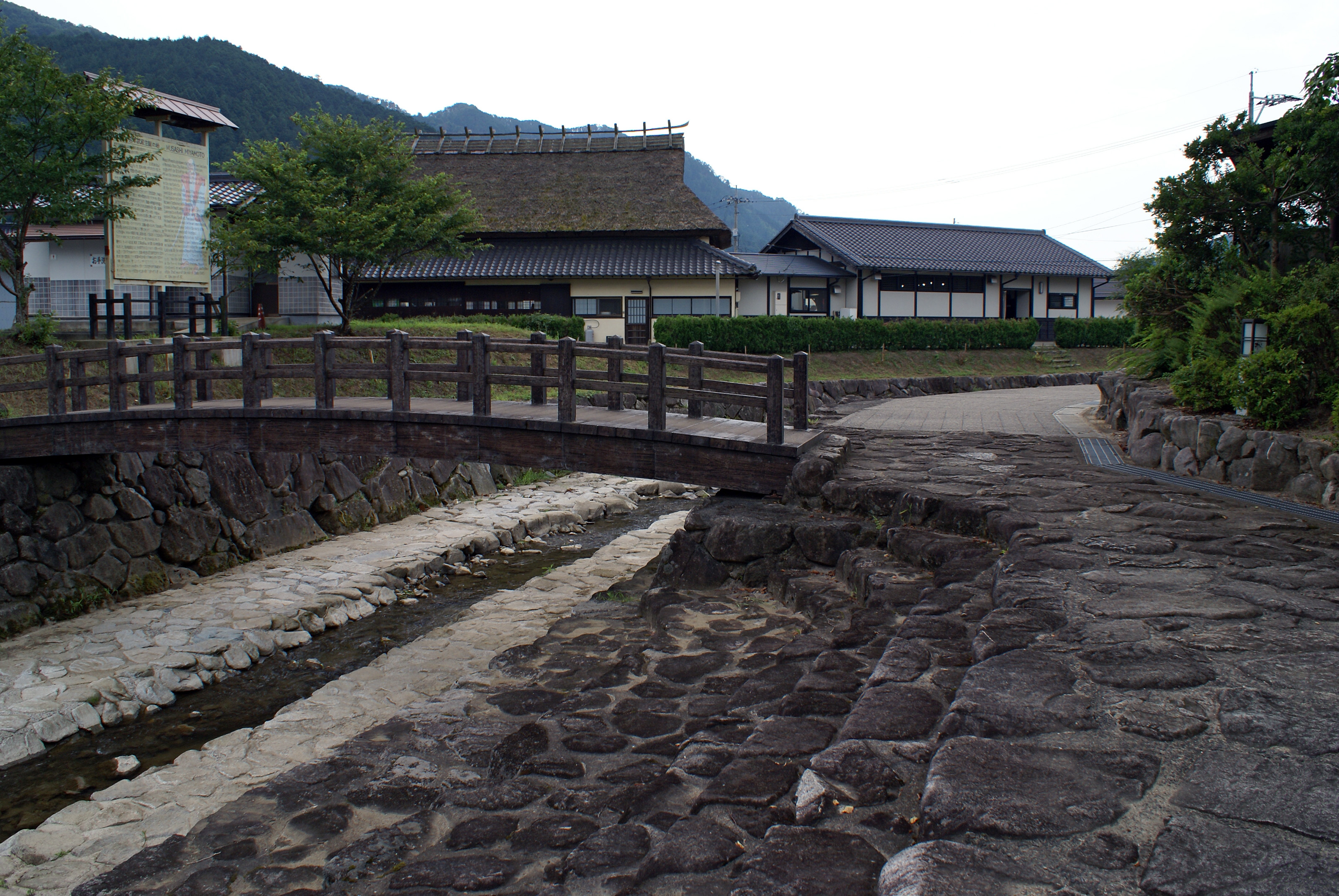
Village of Miyamoto Musashi

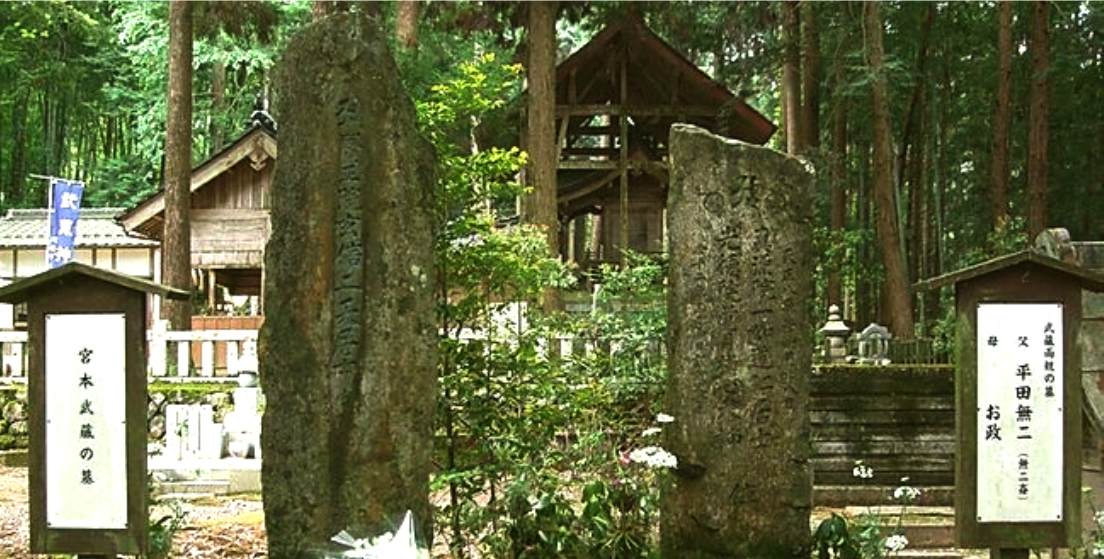
Statue of Miyamoto Musashi

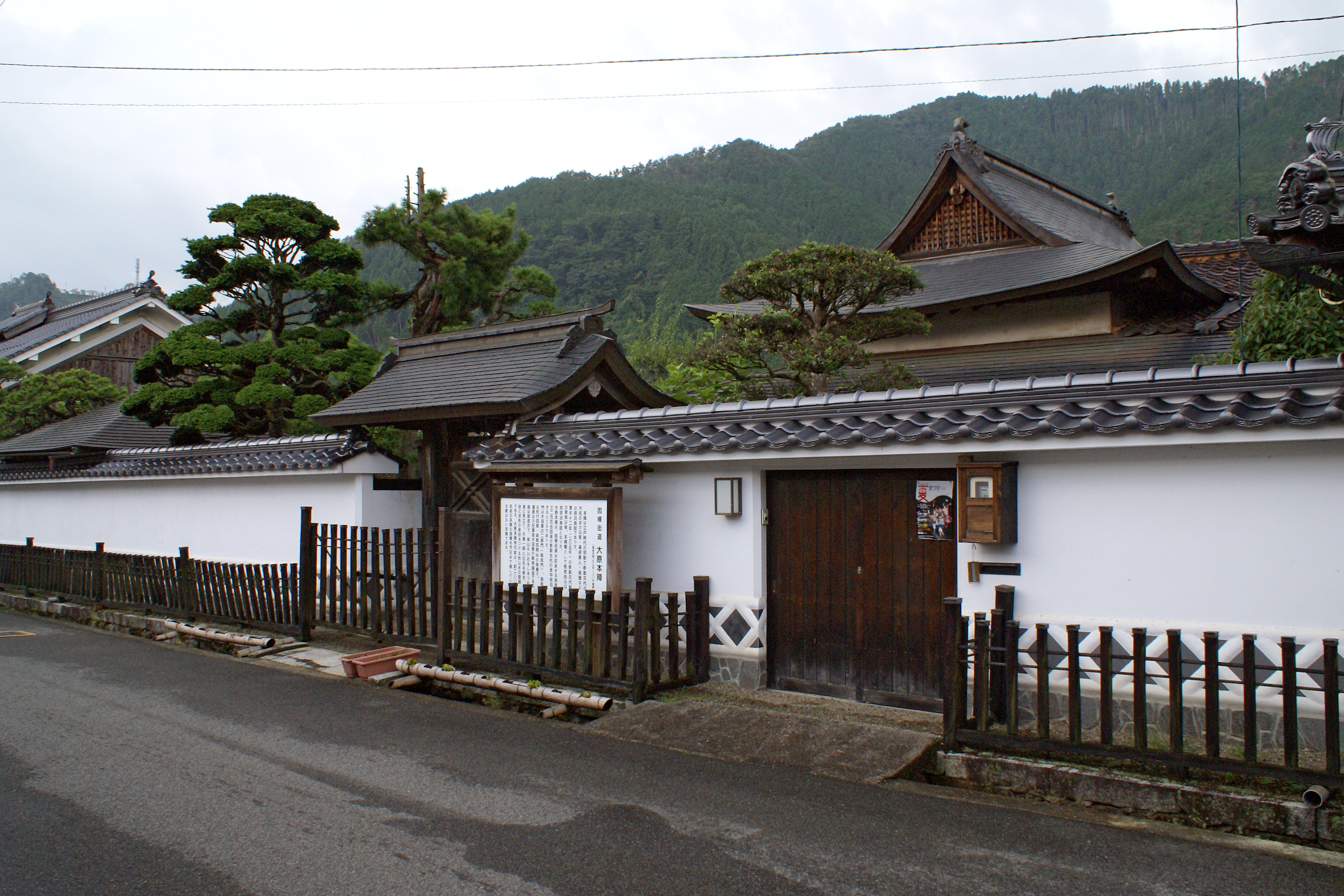
Ōhara-shuku
