= Mimasaka, Okayama =

Mimasaka 美作市
- City
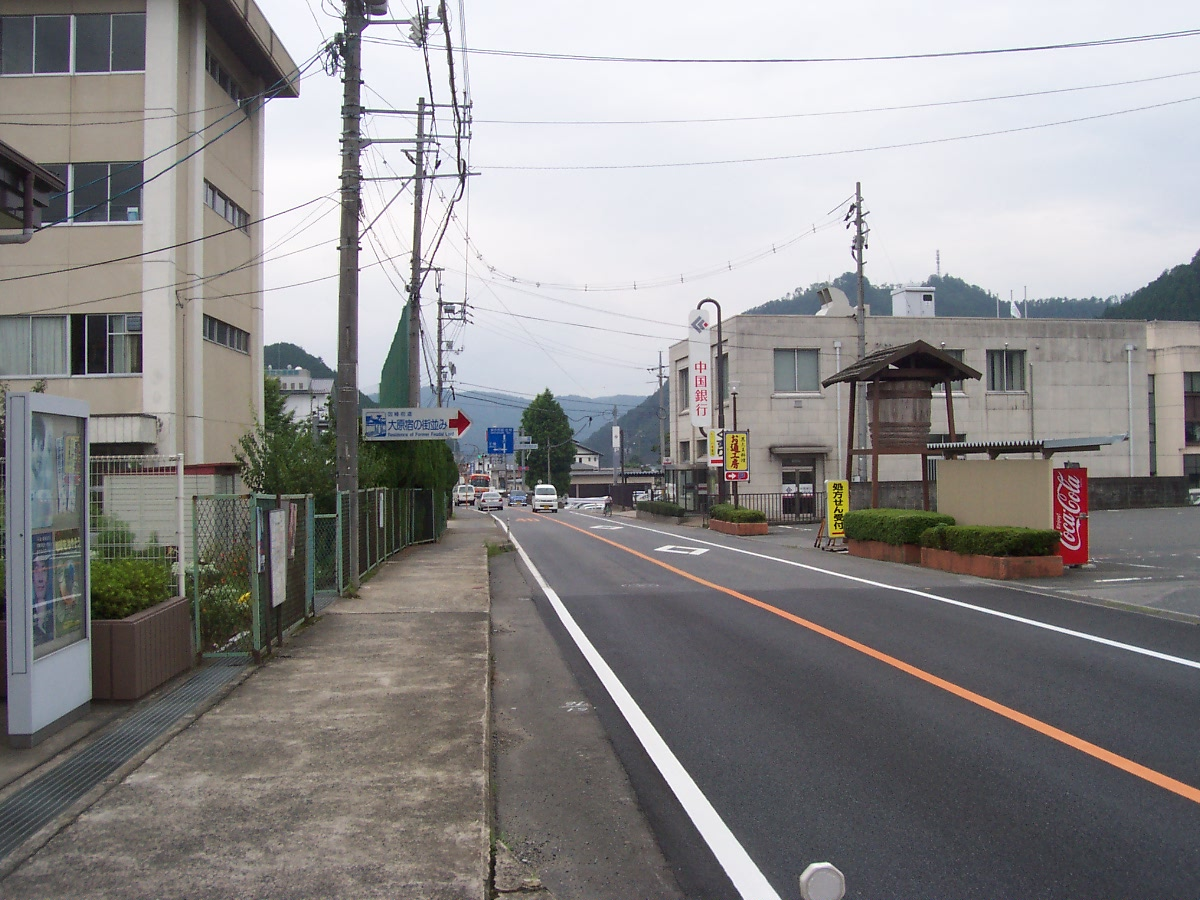
- Main street in Ohara Mimasaka

- Flag Emblem
- Interactive map of Mimasaka
- Location in Japan
- Coordinates: 35°0′31″N 134°8′55″E
- Country: Japan
- Region: Chūgoku (San'yō)
- Prefecture: Okayama

Government
  - Mayor: Seiji Hagiwara <萩原誠司> (from March 2014)

Area
  - Total: 429.29 km^{2} (165.75 sq mi)

Population (January 31, 2023)
  - Total: 25,946
  - Density: 60.439/km^{2} (156.54/sq mi)
- Time zone: UTC+09:00 (JST)
- City hall address: 38-2 Sakaemachi, Mimasaka-shi, Okayama-ken 707-8501
- Climate: Cfa
- Website: Official website
- Symbols
- Flower: Erythronium japonicum
- Tree: Prunus mume

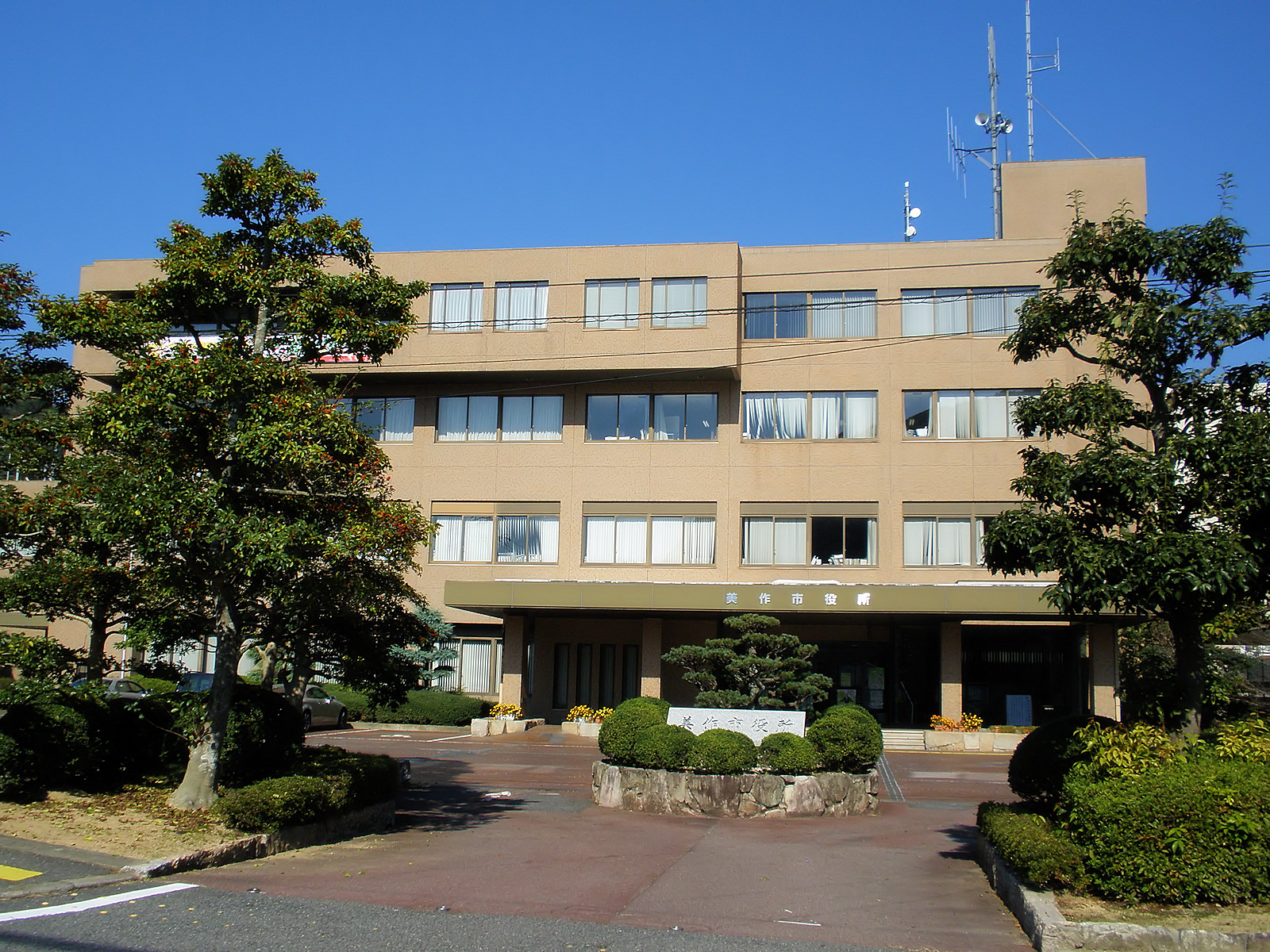
Mimasaka city hall

Mimasaka (美作市, Mimasaka-shi; Japanese pronunciation: [mʲì.mä́.sä̀.kä̀, -sä́.kä́.ɕì]) is a city located in Okayama Prefecture, Japan. As of 31 January 2023, the city had an estimated population of 25,946 in 12287 households and a population density of 60 persons per km^{2}. The total area of the city is 429.29 square kilometres (165.75 sq mi).

== Geography ==
Mimasaka is located in northeast Okayama. Most of the city limits are hills and forests. The prefectural border is at the Chugoku Mountains, and there is Mount Ushiro (1344 meters), the highest peak in the prefecture is within the city limits. Parts of the city are considered to be heavy snowfall areas.

=== Adjoining municipalities ===
Hyōgo Prefecture

- Sayō
- Shisō

Okayama Prefecture

- Bizen
- Misaki
- Shōō
- Nagi
- Nishiawakura
- Wake

Tottori Prefecture

- Chizu

== Climate ==
Mimasaka has a humid subtropical climate (Köppen climate classification Cfa). The average annual temperature in Mimasaka is 13.3 °C (55.9 °F). The average annual rainfall is 1,620.4 mm (63.80 in) with July as the wettest month. The temperatures are highest on average in August, at around 25.6 °C (78.1 °F), and lowest in January, at around 1.6 °C (34.9 °F). The highest temperature ever recorded in Mimasaka was 38.5 °C (101.3 °F) on 7 August 1994; the coldest temperature ever recorded was −13.6 °C (7.5 °F) on 28 February 1981.

Climate data for Mimasaka (1991−2020 normals, extremes 1978−present)
Month	Jan	Feb	Mar	Apr	May	Jun	Jul	Aug	Sep	Oct	Nov	Dec	Year
Record high °C (°F)	15.5 (59.9)	20.6 (69.1)	24.6 (76.3)	29.7 (85.5)	32.0 (89.6)	37.0 (98.6)	36.8 (98.2)	38.5 (101.3)	35.8 (96.4)	30.5 (86.9)	24.3 (75.7)	18.2 (64.8)	38.5 (101.3)
Mean daily maximum °C (°F)	6.6 (43.9)	7.8 (46.0)	12.1 (53.8)	18.4 (65.1)	23.4 (74.1)	26.3 (79.3)	29.9 (85.8)	31.4 (88.5)	27.1 (80.8)	21.4 (70.5)	15.2 (59.4)	9.1 (48.4)	19.1 (66.3)
Daily mean °C (°F)	1.6 (34.9)	2.4 (36.3)	6.0 (42.8)	11.6 (52.9)	16.8 (62.2)	20.8 (69.4)	24.7 (76.5)	25.6 (78.1)	21.4 (70.5)	15.2 (59.4)	9.1 (48.4)	3.8 (38.8)	13.3 (55.9)
Mean daily minimum °C (°F)	−2.4 (27.7)	−2.1 (28.2)	0.5 (32.9)	5.1 (41.2)	10.6 (51.1)	16.1 (61.0)	20.7 (69.3)	21.2 (70.2)	16.9 (62.4)	10.0 (50.0)	4.1 (39.4)	−0.5 (31.1)	8.4 (47.0)
Record low °C (°F)	−11.1 (12.0)	−13.6 (7.5)	−7.9 (17.8)	−4.4 (24.1)	0.0 (32.0)	5.1 (41.2)	11.4 (52.5)	12.9 (55.2)	4.9 (40.8)	−0.8 (30.6)	−4.2 (24.4)	−11.6 (11.1)	−13.6 (7.5)
Average precipitation mm (inches)	73.8 (2.91)	81.4 (3.20)	116.5 (4.59)	126.9 (5.00)	164.7 (6.48)	193.6 (7.62)	252.7 (9.95)	163.5 (6.44)	192.2 (7.57)	109.2 (4.30)	70.0 (2.76)	75.9 (2.99)	1,620.4 (63.80)
Average snowfall cm (inches)	40 (16)	35 (14)	4 (1.6)	0 (0)	0 (0)	0 (0)	0 (0)	0 (0)	0 (0)	0 (0)	0 (0)	19 (7.5)	97 (38)
Average precipitation days (≥ 1.0 mm)	11.2	11.8	11.9	10.4	10.7	12.4	12.9	10.2	10.4	8.5	8.0	9.6	128
Average snowy days (≥ 3 cm)	4.3	3.2	0.6	0	0	0	0	0	0	0	0	1.7	9.8
Mean monthly sunshine hours	107.8	117.2	156.0	193.8	204.9	149.4	150.6	188.0	150.7	160.1	134.5	121.5	1,832.9
Source: Japan Meteorological Agency

== Demographics ==
Per Japanese census data, the population of Mimasaka in 2020 is 25,939 people. Mimasaka has been conducting censuses since 1920.

Historical population
Year	Pop.	±%
1920	48,439	—
1925	48,519	+0.2%
1930	48,222	−0.6%
1935	47,435	−1.6%
1940	46,164	−2.7%
1945	59,880	+29.7%
1950	60,755	+1.5%
1955	57,761	−4.9%
1960	52,598	−8.9%
1965	45,973	−12.6%
1970	40,731	−11.4%
1975	38,793	−4.8%
1980	38,430	−0.9%
1985	38,309	−0.3%
1990	36,942	−3.6%
1995	36,140	−2.2%
2000	34,577	−4.3%
2005	32,479	−6.1%
2010	30,504	−6.1%
2015	27,977	−8.3%
2020	25,939	−7.3%
Mimasaka population statistics

== History ==
The area of Mimasaka is part of ancient Mimasaka Province, from which it takes its name. The Hayashino district, which is the center of the city, has long been an important transportation hub, and since the Sengoku period, goods have been transported by boats crossing the Yoshii River. In the Edo period, the Mori clan, who were the first daimyō of Tsuyama Domain, gave local merchants the same level of authority as merchants in the castle town of Tsuyama, making it the center of eastern Mimasaka. Afterwards, it came under the direct control of the Tokugawa shogunate and a magistrate's office was established. The famed samurai Miyamoto Musashi was born in what is now part of the city.

The modern city of Mimasaka was founded on March 31, 2005, by the merger of the former town of Mimasaka, absorbing the towns of Aida, Ōhara and Sakutō, the village Higashiawakura (all from Aida District), and the town of Katsuta (from Katsuta District).

== Government ==
Mimasaka has a mayor-council form of government with a directly elected mayor and a unicameral city council of 18 members. Mimasaka, collectively with the village of Nishiawakura, contributes one member to the Okayama Prefectural Assembly. In terms of national politics, the city is part of the Okayama 3rd district of the lower house of the Diet of Japan.

== Economy ==
Mimasaka has a mixed economy based on manufacturing, wholesale and retail commerce, agriculture, forestry, and tourism (hot springs).

== Education ==
Mimasaka has nine public elementary schools and five public junior high school operated by the city government, and one public high school operated by the Okayama prefectural Board of Education.

== Transportation ==
=== Railway ===
JR West (JR West) - Kishin Line

- Mimasaka-Doi - Mimasaka-Emi - Narahara - Hayashino

Chizu Express - Chizu Line

- Miyamoto Musashi - Ōhara

=== Highways ===
- Chūgoku Expressway
- Tottori Expressway
- National Route 179
- National Route 373
- National Route 374
- National Route 429

== Sister cities ==
- Former Ōhara town
  - Echizen (Former Imadate town), Fukui, Japan — Sister city agreement concluded in 1990
  - Neyagawa, Osaka, Japan — Friendship city agreement concluded in 1991
  - Gleizé, France - Sister city agreement concluded on March 4, 1999
- Former Sakutō town
  - Saint-Valentin, France — Sister city agreement concluded on April 6, 1988
  - Sankt Valentin, Austria — Sister city agreement concluded on October 25, 1994
  - Saint-Valentin, Canada — Sister city agreement concluded on October 24, 1997

== Local attractions ==
- Chōfuku-ji Temple
- Japan museum of contemporary toy & Hall of music box
- Miyamoto Musashi Budokan
- Ōhara-shuku (Shukuba)
- Okayama International Circuit
- Valentine Park Sakutō
- Village of Miyamoto Musashi
- Yunogo Onsen
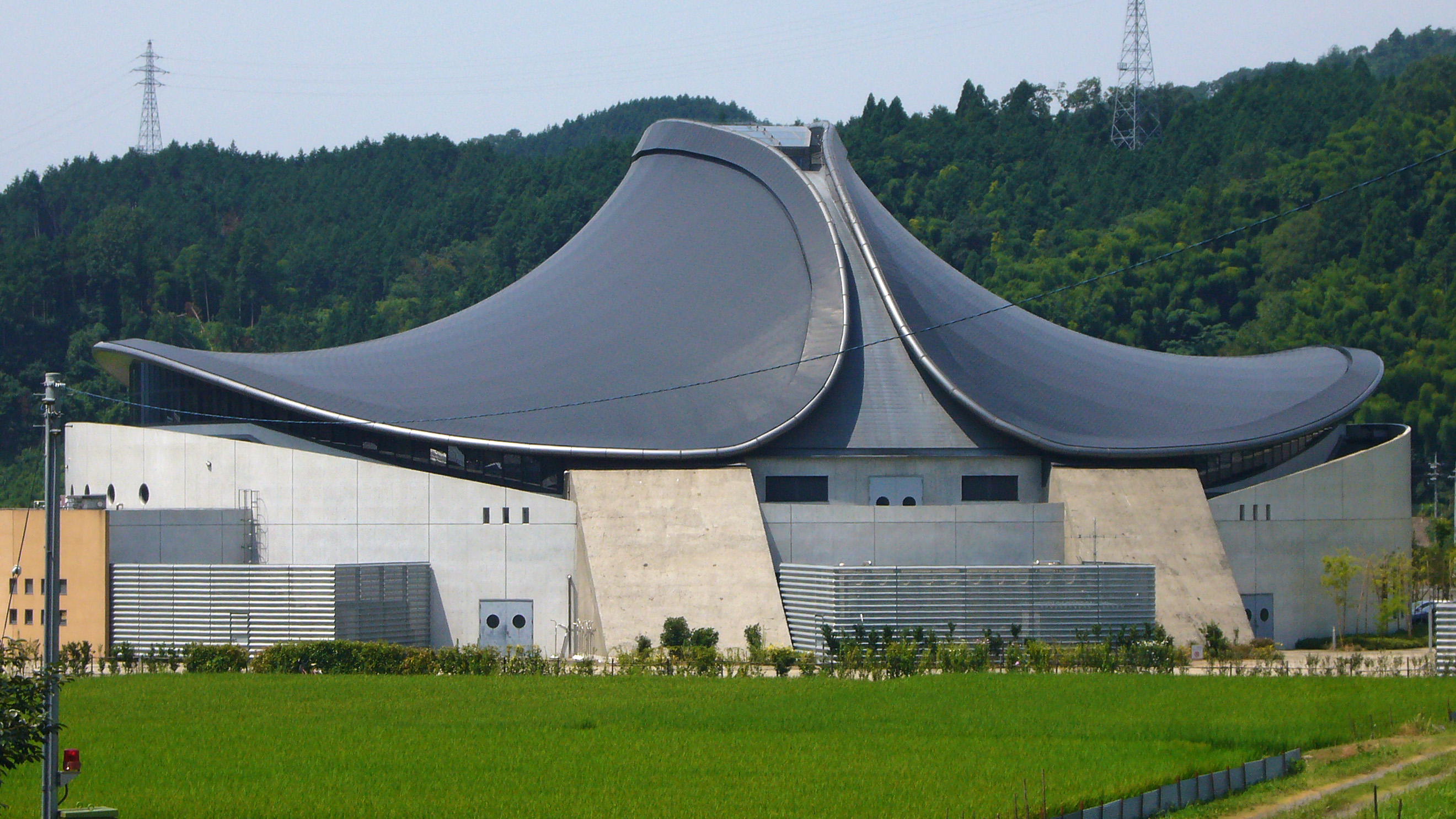
Miyamoto Musashi Budokan

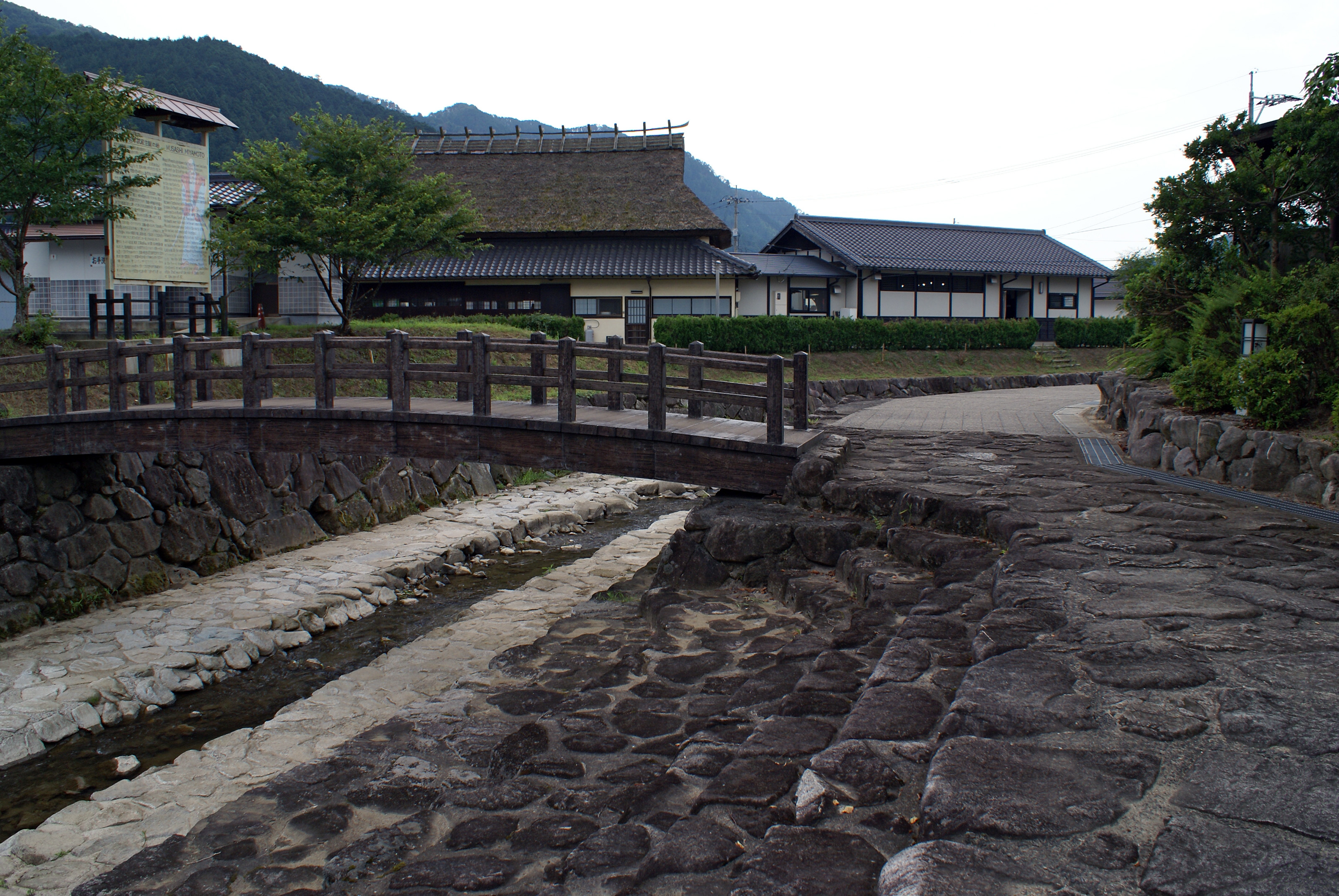
Village of Miyamoto Musashi

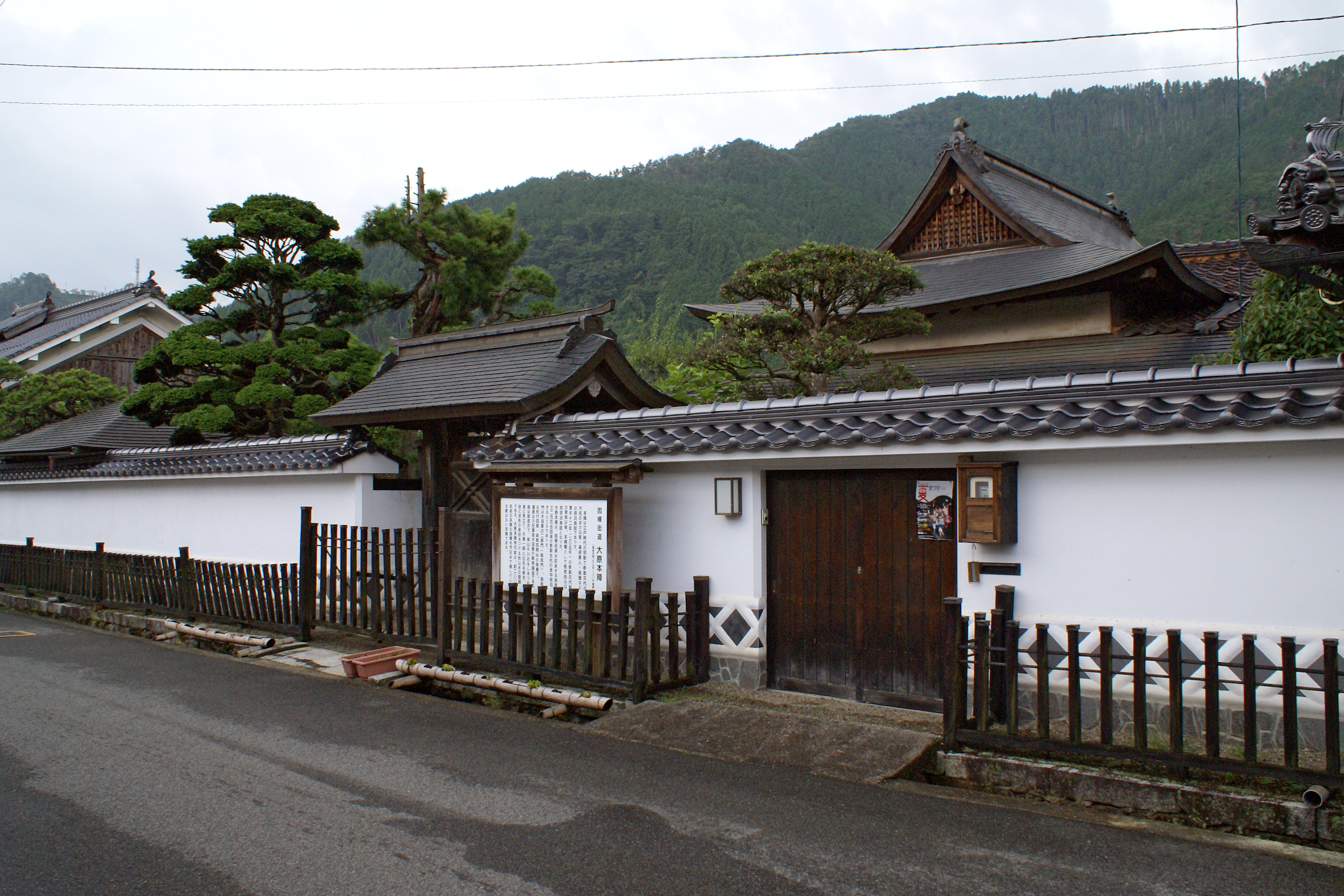
Ōhara-shuku

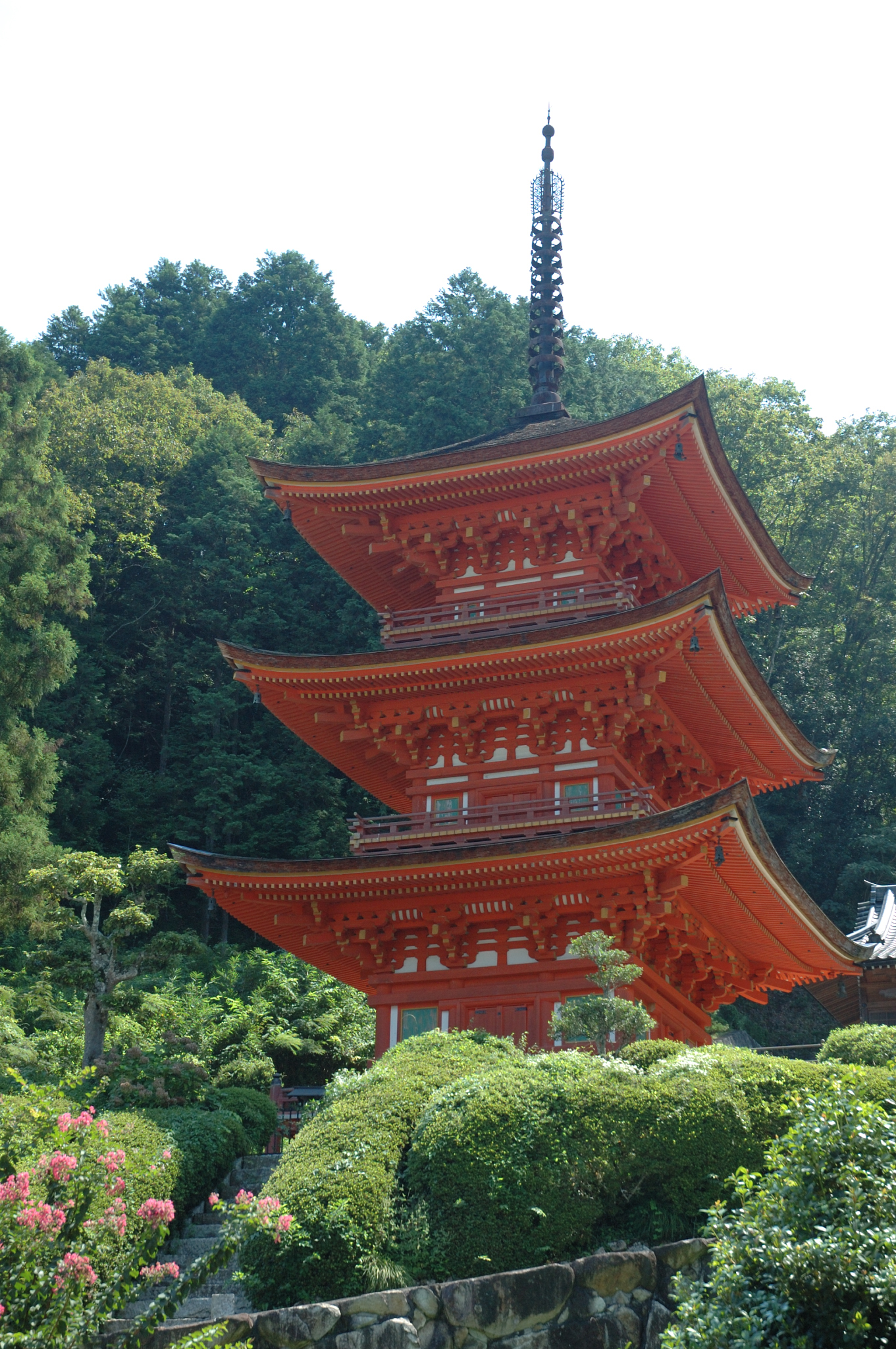
Chōfuku-ji Temple

== Notable people from Mimasaka ==
- Tomoji Abe, author
- Atsuko Asano, author
- Miyamoto Musashi, noted samurai in the Edo Period
- Doshin So, founder of Shorinji Kempo
