= Sakutō, Okayama =

Sakutō 作東町
- Former municipality
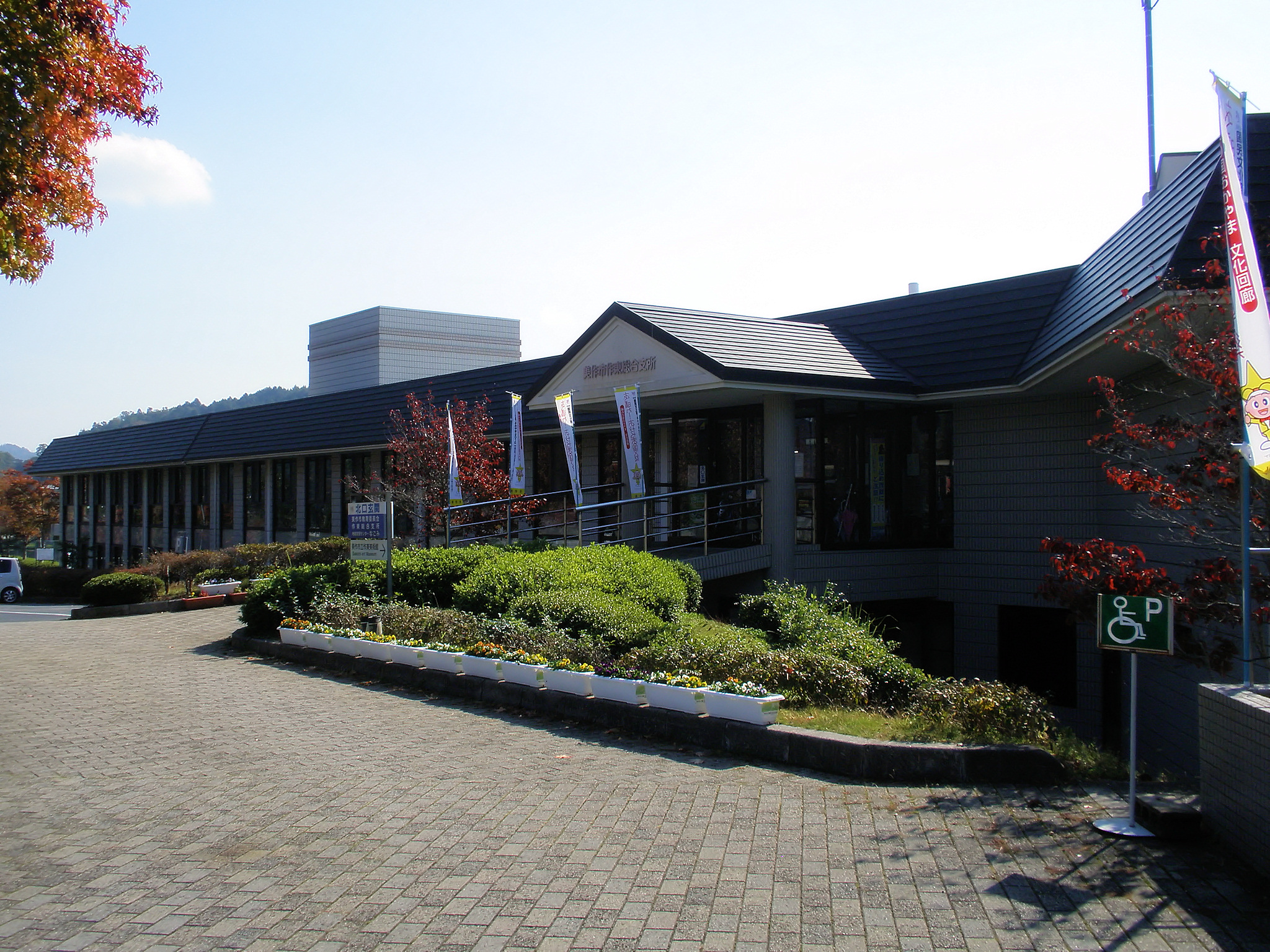
- Former Sakutō town hall

- Location in Japan
- Coordinates: 35°1′16.3″N 134°13′52.6″E
- Country: Japan
- Region: Chūgoku
- Prefecture: Okayama Prefecture
- District: Aida
- Merged: March 31, 2005 (now part of Mimasaka)

Area
  - Total: 109.03 km^{2} (42.10 sq mi)

Population (2003)
  - Total: 7,577
  - Density: 69.49/km^{2} (180.0/sq mi)
- Time zone: UTC+09:00 (JST)
- Symbols
- Flower: Cherry blossom
- Tree: Maple

Sakutō (作東町, Sakutō-chō) was a town located in Aida District, Okayama Prefecture, Japan.

== Population ==
As of 2003, the town had an estimated population of 7,577 and a density of 69.49 persons per km^{2}. The total area was 109.03 km^{2}.

== History ==
On March 31, 2005, Sakutō, along with the towns of Mimasaka (former), Aida and Ōhara, the village of Higashiawakura (all from Aida District), and the town of Katsuta (from Katsuta District), was merged to create the city of Mimasaka.

== Geography ==
=== Adjoining municipalities ===
- Okayama Prefecture
  - Mimasaka (town)
  - Ōhara
  - Aida
  - Katsuta
  - Bizen
- Hyōgo Prefecture
  - Sayō
  - Kōzuki

== Education ==
- Emi Elementary School
- Doi Elementary School
- Awai Elementary School
- Yoshino Elementary School (Closure in 2008)
- Sakutō Junior High School
- Okayama Prefectural Emi Commercial High School (Closure in 2009)

== Sister cities ==
- Saint-Valentin (France)
- Sankt Valentin (Austria)
- Saint-Valentin (Canada)

== Transportation ==
=== Railways ===
- West Japan Railway Company
  - Kishin Line
    - Mimasaka-Doi Station - Mimasaka-Emi Station

=== Road ===
- Expressways:
  - Chūgoku Expressway
    - Sakutō Interchange
- National highways:
  - Route 179
  - Route 429
- Prefectural roads:
  - Okayama Prefectural Route 5 (Sakutō-Ōhara)
  - Okayama Prefectural Route 46 (Wake-Sasame-Sakutō)
  - Okayama Prefectural Route 161 (Ichiba-Sayō)
  - Okayama Prefectural Route 358 (Sagisu-Mizoguchi)
  - Okayama Prefectural Route 360 (Manzen-Mimasaka)
  - Okayama Prefectural Route 365 (Kamifukuhara-Sayō)
  - Okayama Prefectural Route 479 (Seto-Munakake)

== Notable places and events ==
- Valentine Park Sakutō
