= Aida, Okayama =

Aida 英田町
- Former municipality
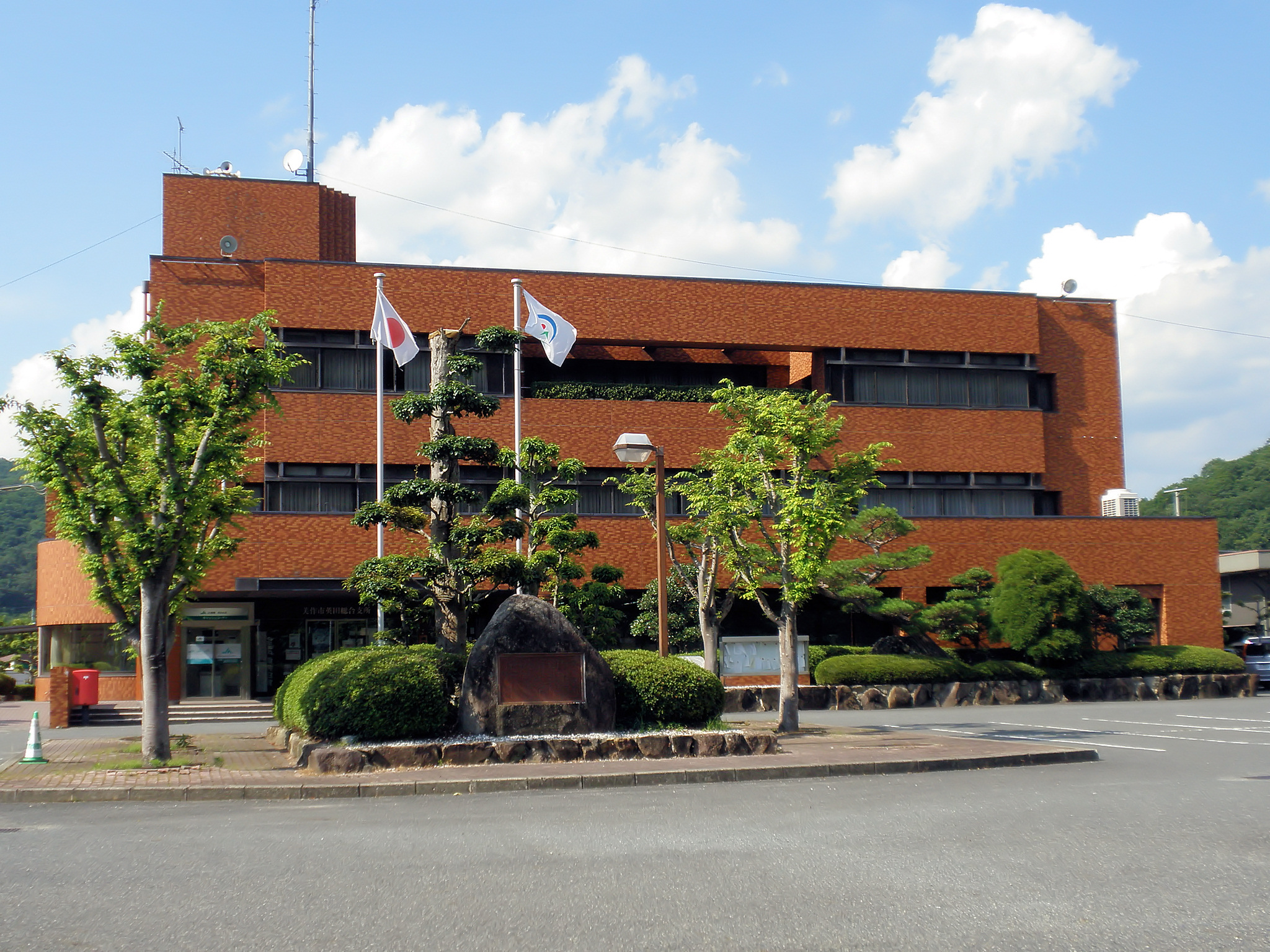
- Former Aida town hall

- Location in Japan
- Coordinates: 34°56′20.2″N 134°7′31.1″E
- Country: Japan
- Region: Chūgoku
- Prefecture: Okayama Prefecture
- District: Aida
- Merged: March 31, 2005 (now part of Mimasaka)

Area
  - Total: 63.41 km^{2} (24.48 sq mi)

Population (2003)
  - Total: 3,625
  - Density: 57.17/km^{2} (148.1/sq mi)
- Time zone: UTC+09:00 (JST)
- Symbols
- Flower: Rhododendron
- Tree: Live oak

Aida (英田町, Aida-chō) was a town located in Aida District, Okayama Prefecture, Japan.

As of 2003, the town had an estimated population of 3,625 and a density of 57.17 persons per km^{2}. The total area was 63.41 km^{2}.

On March 31, 2005, Aida, along with the towns of Mimasaka (former), Ōhara and Sakutō, the village of Higashiawakura (all from Aida District), and the town of Katsuta (from Katsuta District), was merged to create the city of Mimasaka.

In the 1990s, Aida's TI Circuit hosted two Formula One races called the Pacific Grand Prix.

== Geography ==
=== Adjoining municipalities ===
- Okayama Prefecture
  - Mimasaka (town)
  - Sakutō
  - Wake
  - Saeki
  - Bizen
  - Misaki

== Education ==
- Aida Elementary School
- Aida Junior High School

== Transportation ==
=== Road ===
- National highways:
  - Route 374
- Prefectural roads:
  - Okayama Prefectural Route 46 (Wake-Sasame-Sakutō)
  - Okayama Prefectural Route 90 (Akō-Saeki)
  - Okayama Prefectural Route 362 (Iden-Yūka)
  - Okayama Prefectural Route 379 (Dōdō-Kashimura)
  - Okayama Prefectural Route 414 (Fukumoto-Wake)
  - Okayama Prefectural Route 426 (Tama-Takimiya)

== Notable places and events ==
- Okayama International Circuit
- Chōfukuji Temple
