= Tottori Expressway =

Road in Japan

Tottori Expressway
- 鳥取自動車道

Route information
- Maintained by Ministry of Land, Infrastructure, Transport and Tourism
- Length: 62.3 km (38.7 mi)
- Existed: 1981–present
- Component highways: National Route 373

Major junctions
- From: Sayō Junction in Sayō, Hyōgo; Chūgoku Expressway
- To: Tottori Interchange in Tottori; San'in Expressway

Location
- Country: Japan
- Major cities: Mimasaka

Highway system
- National highways of Japan; Expressways of Japan

The Tottori Expressway (鳥取自動車道, Tottori Jidōsha-dō) is an expressway connecting Sayō in Hyōgo Prefecture and Tottori, the capital and largest city in Tottori Prefecture. It is owned and operated partly by the West Nippon Expressway Company and the Ministry of Land, Infrastructure, Transport and Tourism. The expressway is signed as an auxiliary route of National Route 373 as well as E29 under the Ministry of Land, Infrastructure, Transport and Tourism's "2016 Proposal for Realization of Expressway Numbering."

== Naming ==
The expressway is officially referred to as the Chūgoku-Ōdan Expressway Himeji Tottori Route. The Chūgoku-Ōdan Expressway Himeji Tottori Route is the official designation for the Sanyō Expressway between Sanyō Himeji-Nishi Interchange and Harima Junction, the Harima Expressway between Harima Junction and Yamazaki Junction, the Chūgoku Expressway between Yamazaki Junction and Sayō Junction, and the Tottori Expressway between Sayō Junction and Tottori Interchange (concurrent with the Chūgoku-Ōdan Expressway Himeji Tottori Route).

== Route description ==
From Sayo Junction to Sayo Toll Gate the expressway is maintained and tolled by the West Nippon Expressway Company. The rest of the expressway is able to be driven without any fees. That section of the expressway is maintained by the Chūgoku branch of the Ministry of Land, Infrastructure, Transport and Tourism.

The entire expressway has only one lane in each direction, except for the section between Sayō Junction and Sayō Toll Gate.

== History ==
The first section of the Tottori Expressway to open was the 2.5 kilometres (1.6 mi) Shidosaka Tunnel section between Sakane Junction in Nishiawakura and Chizu in 1981. The final section of the expressway (8.8 km between Ōhara Interchange and Nishi-Awakura Interchange) was opened on March 23, 2013.

== List of interchanges and features ==
- IC - interchange, SIC - smart interchange, JCT - junction, SA - service area, PA - parking area, BS - bus stop, TN - tunnel, TB - toll gate

| No. | Name | Connections | Dist. from Origin | Bus Stop | Notes | Location | |
|---|---|---|---|---|---|---|---|
| (10-1) | Sayō JCT | Chūgoku Expressway | 0.0 | | | Sayō | Hyōgo |
| TB | Sayō TB | | 1.0 | | | Sayō | Hyōgo |
| BS | Sayō-Hirafuku BS | | 3.6 | ○ | | Sayō | Hyōgo |
| 1 | Sayō-Hirafuku IC | National Route 373 | 3.7 | | southbound exit, northbound entrance | Sayō | Hyōgo |
| 2 | Ōhara IC | National Route 429 | 10.9 | ○ | | Mimasaka | Okayama |
| BS | Nishi-Awakura BS | | 18.3 | ○ | | Nishiawakura | Okayama |
| | | | 19.0 | | Beginning of concurrency with Shidosaka Pass Road. | Nishiawakura | Okayama |
| 3 | Nishi-Awakura IC | National Route 373 | 19.7 | | | Nishiawakura | Okayama |
| 3-1 | Sakane Intersection | National Route 373 | 22.9 | | | Nishiawakura | Okayama |
| 2.5 km gap in the expressway, connection is made by National Route 373 | | | | | | Nishiawakura | Okayama |
| TN | Shidosaka Tunnel | | | | Length - 1,630 m (5,350 ft) | Nishiawakura | Okayama |
| TN | Shidosaka Tunnel | | | | Length - 1,630 m (5,350 ft) | Chizu | Tottori |
| 3-1 | Komagaeri Intersection | National Route 373 | 25.4 | | North end of concurrency with Shidosaka Pass Road. | Chizu | Tottori |
| PA | Fukuhara PA | | 27.8 | ○ | PA:Southbound entrance only | Chizu | Tottori |
| 4 | Chizu-Minami IC | National Route 373 | 29.3 | | northbound exit, southbound entrance | Chizu | Tottori |
| 5 | Chizu IC | National Route 53; National Route 373 | 37.6 | | | Chizu | Tottori |
| 6 | Mochigase IC/PA | Tottori Prefectural Route 49 | 48.1 | ○ | | Tottori | Tottori |
| 7 | Kawahara IC/PA | National Route 53; National Route 373; Tottori Prefectural Route 324 | 52.6 | ○ | PA:Northbound entrance only | Tottori | Tottori |
| 8 | Tottori-Minami IC | National Route 53; National Route 373 | 55.7 | | northbound exit, southbound entrance | Tottori | Tottori |
| 8 | Tottori-Minami IC | National Route 53; National Route 373 | 57.2 | | southbound exit, northbound entrance | Tottori | Tottori |
| (9) | Tottori JCT | San'in Kinki Expressway; National Route 9 (Bypass) | 62.3 | | | Tottori | Tottori |
Through to San-in Expressway
