= Higashiawakura, Okayama =

Higashiawakura 東粟倉村
- Former municipality
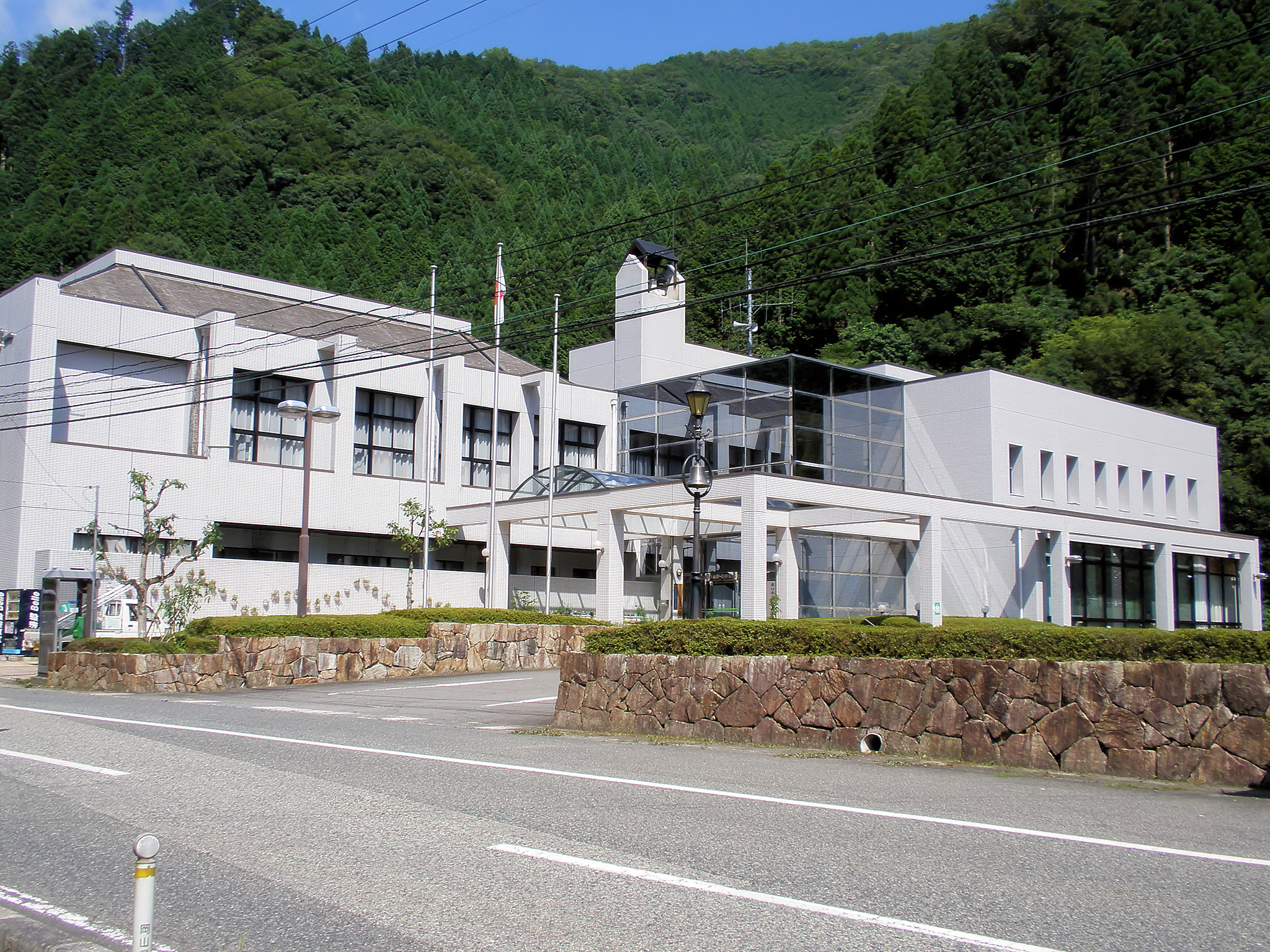
- Former Higashiawakura village hall

- Location in Japan
- Coordinates: 35°8′45.6″N 134°21′34.4″E
- Country: Japan
- Region: Chūgoku
- Prefecture: Okayama Prefecture
- District: Aida
- Merged: March 31, 2005 (now part of Mimasaka)

Area
  - Total: 28.01 km^{2} (10.81 sq mi)

Population (2003)
  - Total: 1,399
  - Density: 49.95/km^{2} (129.4/sq mi)
- Time zone: UTC+09:00 (JST)
- Symbols
- Bird: Japanese bush-warbler
- Flower: Rhododendron subg. Hymenanthes
- Tree: Chamaecyparis obtusa

Higashiawakura (東粟倉村, Higashiawakura-son) was a village located in Aida District, Okayama Prefecture, Japan.

As of 2003, the village had an estimated population of 1,399 and a density of 49.95 persons per km^{2}. The total area was 28.01 km^{2}.

On March 31, 2005, Higashiawakura, along with the towns of Mimasaka (former), Aida, Ōhara and Sakutō (all from Aida District), and the town of Katsuta (from Katsuta District), was merged to create the city of Mimasaka.

== Geography ==
- Mountains: Mount Ushiro (The highest mountain in Okayama Prefecture)

=== Adjoining municipalities ===
- Okayama Prefecture
  - Ōhara
  - Nishiawakura
- Hyōgo Prefecture
  - Sayō
  - Chikusa

== Education ==
- Higashiawakura Elementary School
- Ōhara Junior High School (Ōhara)

== Transportation ==
=== Road ===
- National highways:
  - Route 429
- Prefectural roads:
  - Okayama Prefectural Route 556 (Ushiroyama-Kamiishii)
