= Shōō =

Shōō 勝央町
- Town
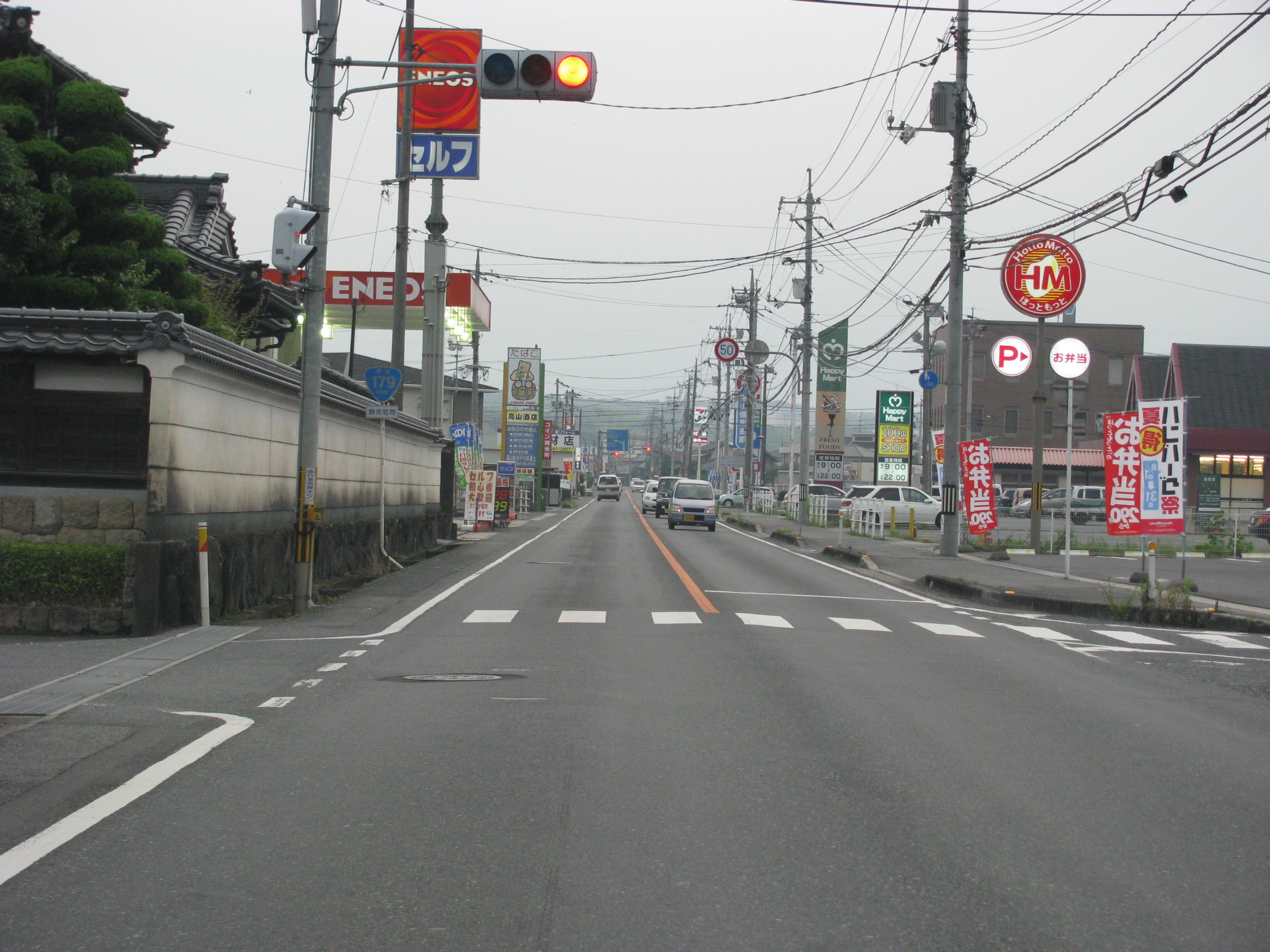
- Japan_National_Route_179 in Shōō

- Flag Chapter
- Location of Shōō in Okayama Prefecture

- Location in Japan
- Coordinates: 35°3′N 134°7′E
- Country: Japan
- Region: Chūgoku; San'yō
- Prefecture: Okayama
- District: Katsuta

Area
  - Total: 54.05 km^{2} (20.87 sq mi)

Population (February 1, 2023)
  - Total: 10,900
  - Density: 202/km^{2} (522/sq mi)
- Time zone: UTC+09:00 (JST)
- City hall address: 201 Katsumata, Shōō-chō, Katsuta-gun, Okayama-ken 709-4316
- Website: Official website
- Symbols
- Flower: Rhododendron
- Tree: Japanese oak

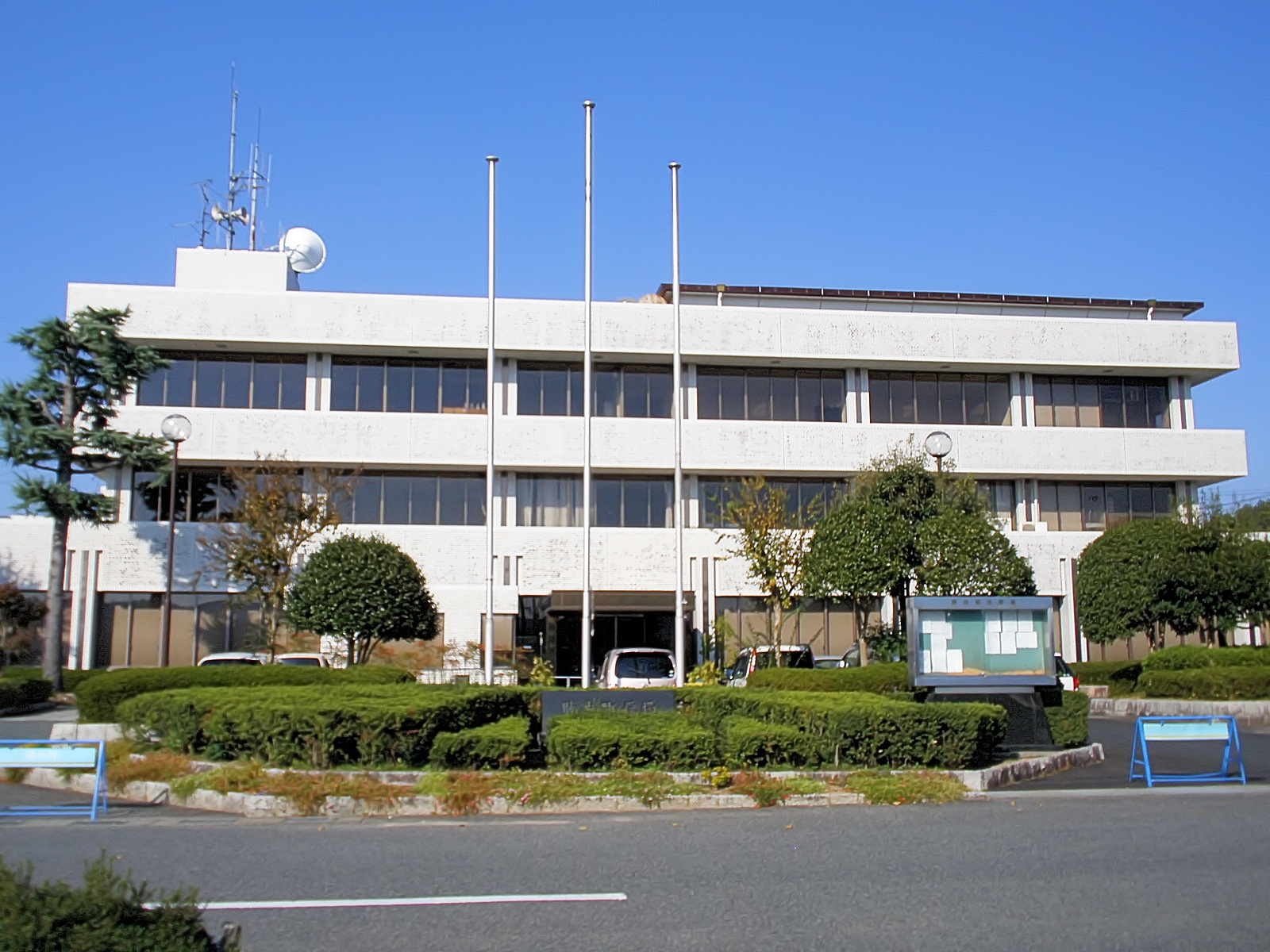
Shōō Town Hall

Shōō (勝央町, Shōō-chō) is a town located in Katsuta District, Okayama Prefecture, Japan. As of 1 September 2022, the town had an estimated population of 10,900 in 4713 households and a population density of 83 persons per km^{2}. The total area of the town is 54.05 square kilometres (20.87 sq mi). Shōō is said to be the place where Kintarō died.

== Geography ==
Shōō is located in the northeastern part of Okayama Prefecture. Located on the southern side of the Chugoku Mountains, it is mostly hills and forests.

=== Neighboring municipalities ===
Okayama Prefecture

- Mimasaka
- Misaki
- Nagi
- Tsuyama

== Climate ==
Shōō has a humid subtropical climate (Köppen Cfa) characterized by warm summers and cool winters with moderate snowfall. The average annual temperature in Shōō is 14.0 °C. The average annual rainfall is 1501 mm with September as the wettest month. The temperatures are highest on average in January, at around 25.9 °C, and lowest in January, at around 2.4 °C.

== Demography ==
Per Japanese census data, the population of Shōō has been as follows.

Historical population
Year	Pop.	±%
1950	14,317	—
1960	12,591	−12.1%
1970	10,773	−14.4%
1980	10,382	−3.6%
1990	11,539	+11.1%
2000	11,428	−1.0%
2010	11,198	−2.0%

== History ==
Shōō is part of ancient Mimasaka Province. Katsurada flourished in the Edo Period as a shukuba on the main pilgrimage route to Izumo Shrine. After the Meiji restoration, it was established as a village with the creation of the modern municipalities system on June 1, 1889, and raised to town status on March 28, 1906. On March 31, 1952, Katsuamada merged with the villages of Koyoshino and Takatori to form the town of Shōō.

== Government ==
Shōō has a mayor-council form of government with a directly elected mayor and a unicameral town council of twelve members. Shōō, collectively with the city of Tsuyama and the towns of Kagami and Nagi, contributes four members to the Okayama Prefectural Assembly. In terms of national politics, the village is part of the Okayama 3rd district of the lower house of the Diet of Japan.

== Economy ==
The main industry in the area is agriculture.The main crops include black soybeans, pears, peaches, chestnuts, and grapes. The Katsutoshi Core Industrial Park is located in the Katsumada area of Shōō and has a number of pharmaceutical and chemical plants.

== Education ==
Shōō has two public elementary schools and one public junior high school operated by the town government, and one public high school operated by the Okayama Prefectural Board of Education.

== Transportation ==
=== Railway ===
JR West (JR West) - Kishin Line

- Katsumada - Nishi-Katsumada

=== Highways ===
- Chūgoku Expressway
- National Route 179
- National Route 429
