= Aida District, Okayama =

District in Okayama Prefecture, Japan

Coordinates: 35°10′N 134°20′E

Location of Aida District in Okayama Prefecture

Aida (英田郡, Aida-gun) is a district located in Okayama Prefecture, Japan.

As of 2025, the district has an estimated population of 1,318. The total area is 57.93 km^{2}.

== Towns and villages ==
Aida District consists of the following village:

- Nishiawakura

== History ==
The district has existed from April 1900.

Prior to March 31, 2005, Aida District included

- Aida
- Higashiawakura
- Mimasaka
- Nishiawakura
- Ōhara
- Sakutō

On that date, all but Nishiawakura merged to form the new city of Mimasaka.
