= Yunogo Onsen =

Hot spring town in Okayama Prefecture, Japan

Coordinates: 34°59′38.1″N 134°8′14.8″E

Yunogo Onsen (湯郷温泉, Yunogō Onsen) or simply Yunogō is a hot spring town located in Mimasaka city of Okayama Prefecture, Japan. The waters of the Yunogo hot springs (onsen in Japanese) are a mixture of sodium chloride and calcium chloride, with the amount of discharge at 540 L/min. The waters are said to have healing effects on those suffering from various health problems.

== History ==
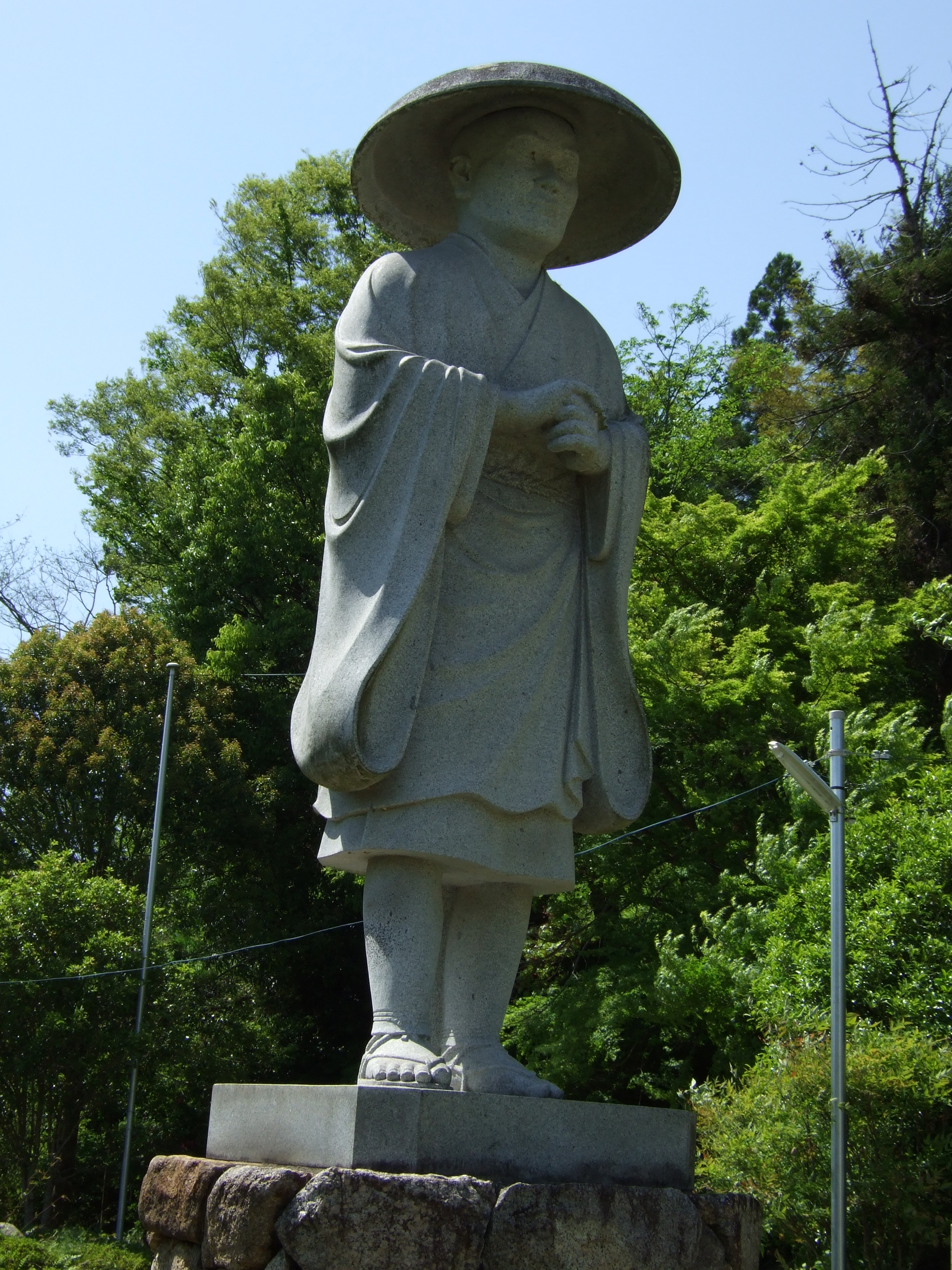
Statue of En-nin in Yunogo

Yunogo Onsen is known as "Sagi no-yu", or hot water of the heron (sagi is the Japanese word for egret or heron) because 1,200 years ago a Buddhist high priest named En-nin-houshi discovered an injured heron bathing its wounded leg in the waters of a hot spring in Yunogo. This is how the special healing powers of these waters were discovered, and they now have evolved into a spot where people come to relax and enjoy the waters. There is a statue of En-nin with a heron outside of the "Yunogo Sagi Onsen-kan", the public bathhouse created in the exact spot where the heron's hot spring was discovered.
