= Japan National Route 374 =

Road in Okayama prefecture, Japan

National Route 374
- 国道374号
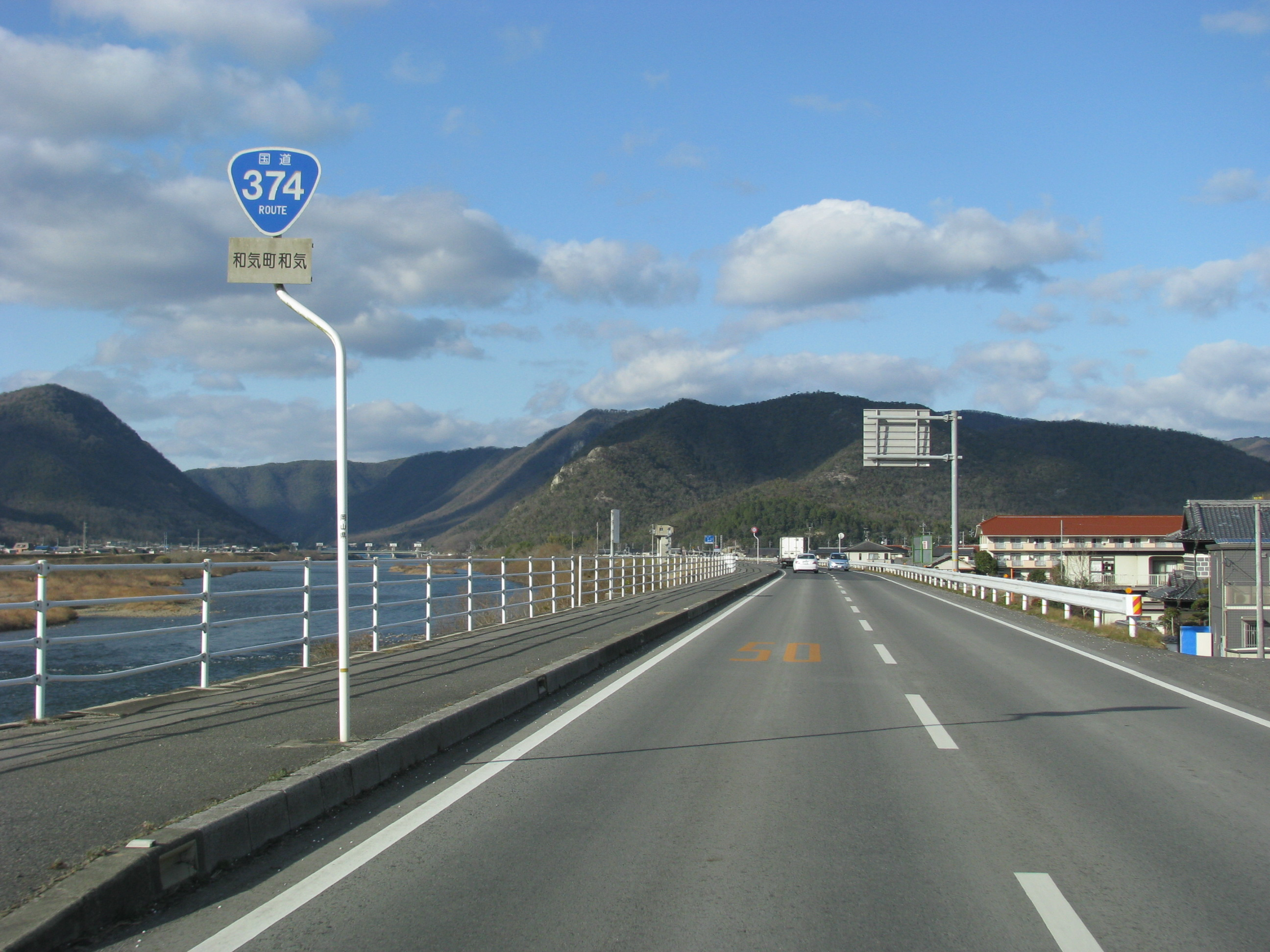

Route information
- Length: 58 km (36 mi)

Location
- Country: Japan

Highway system
- National highways of Japan; Expressways of Japan
← National Route 373	→ National Route 375

National Route 374 is a national highway of Japan connecting Bizen, Okayama and Tsuyama, Okayama in Japan, with a total length of 58 km (36.04 mi).
