= Japan National Route 373 =

Road in Japan

National Route 373
- 国道373号
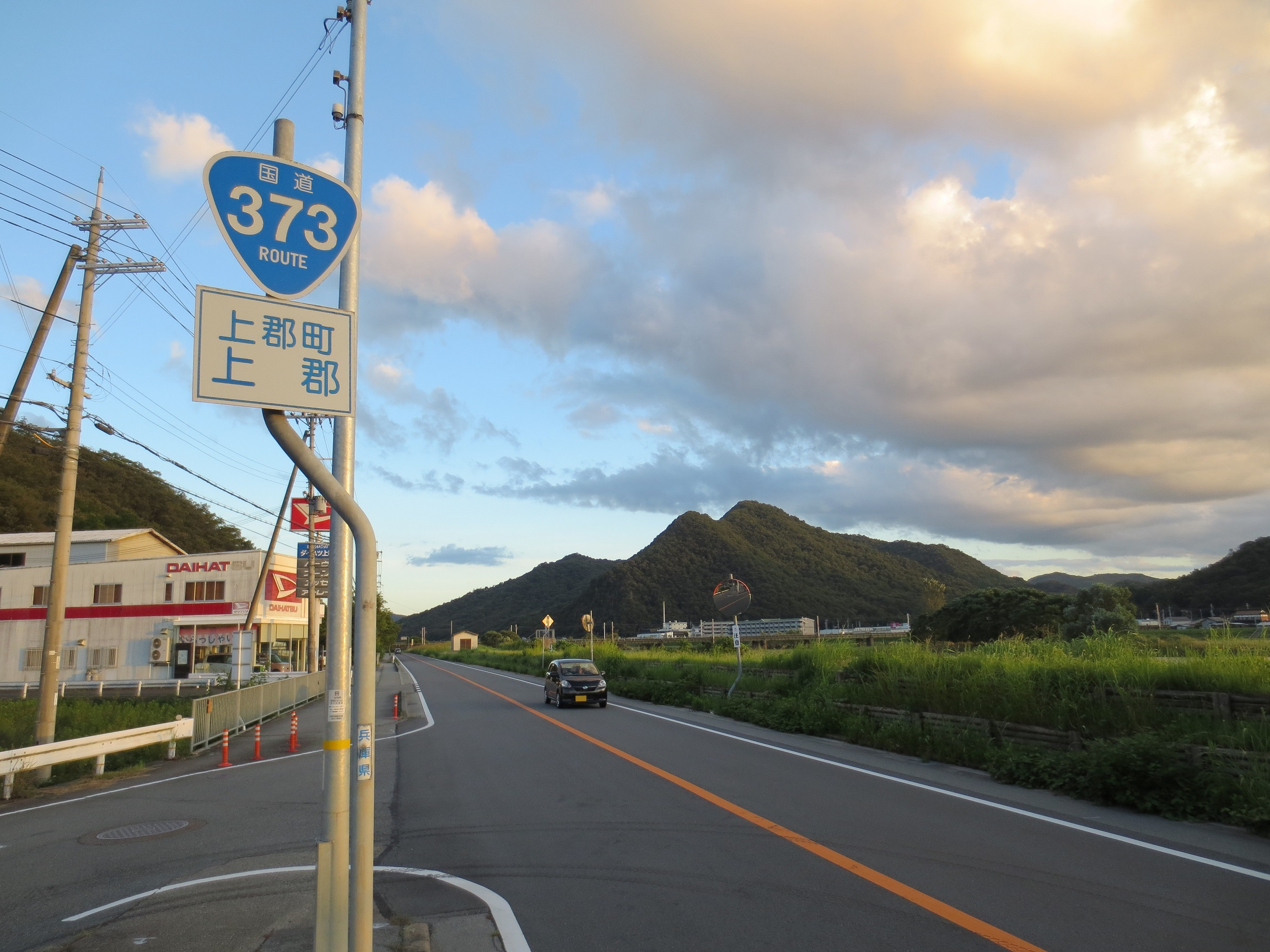

Route information
- Length: 101.9 km (63.3 mi)

Location
- Country: Japan

Highway system
- National highways of Japan; Expressways of Japan
← National Route 372	→ National Route 374

National Route 373 is a national highway of Japan connecting Akō, Hyōgo and Tottori, Tottori in Japan, with a total length of 101.9 km (63.32 mi).
