= Nagi, Okayama =

Nagi 奈義町
- Town
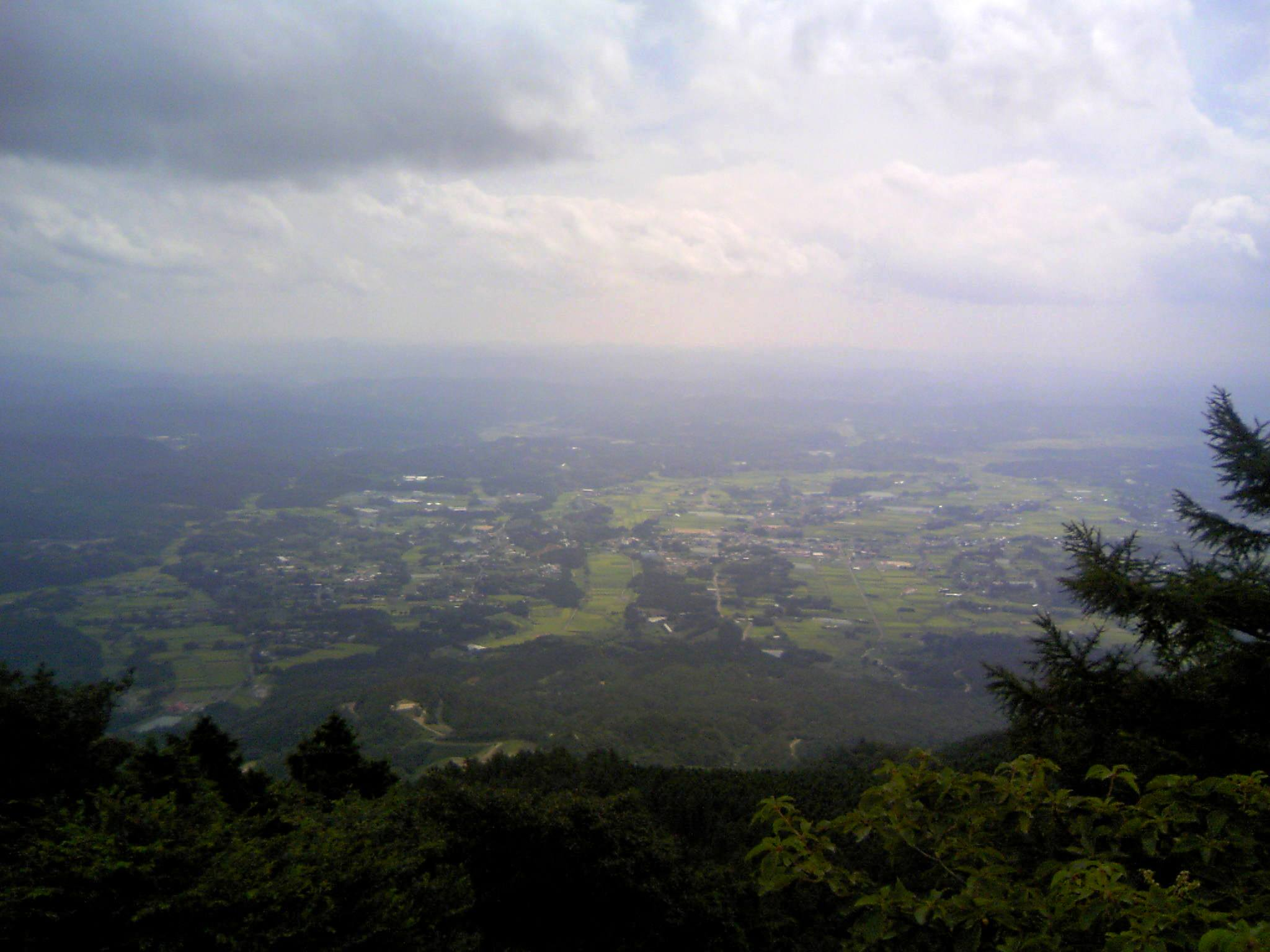
- View of Nagi

- Flag Chapter
- Location of Nagi in Okayama Prefecture

- Location in Japan
- Coordinates: 35°7′N 134°11′E
- Country: Japan
- Region: Chūgoku; San'yō
- Prefecture: Okayama
- District: Katsuta

Area
  - Total: 69.52 km^{2} (26.84 sq mi)

Population (September 1, 2022)
  - Total: 5,738
  - Density: 82.54/km^{2} (213.8/sq mi)
- Time zone: UTC+09:00 (JST)
- City hall address: 306-1 Toyosawa, Nagi-cho, Katsuta-gun, Okayama-ken 708-1392
- Climate: Cfa
- Website: Official website
- Symbols
- Flower: Prunus mume
- Tree: Ginkgo biloba

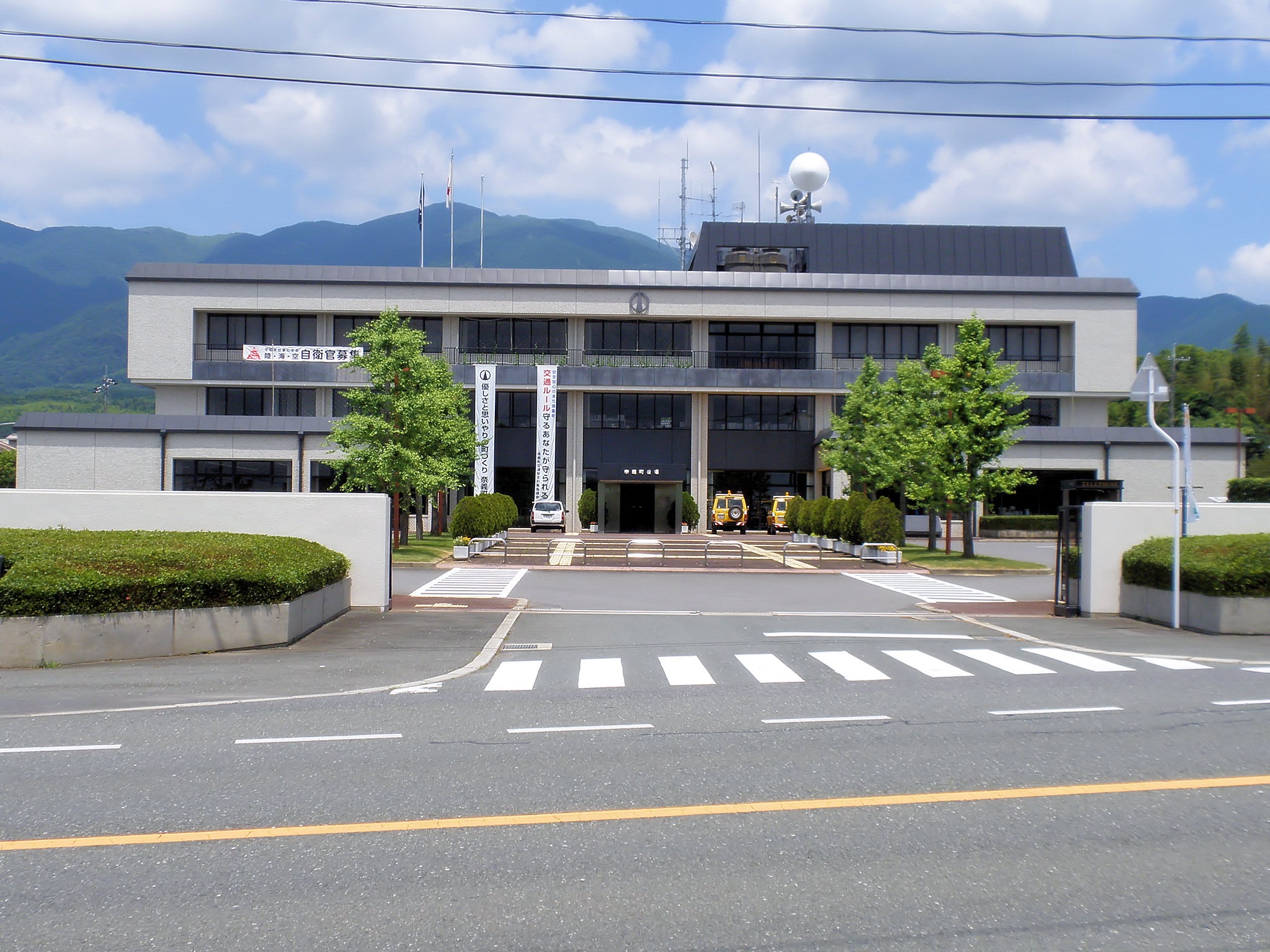
Nagi Town Hall

Nagi (奈義町, Nagi-chō) is a town located in Katsuta District, Okayama Prefecture, Japan. As of 1 December 2024, the town had a population of 5,512 in 2,437 households and a population density of 79.3 persons per km^{2}. The total area of the town is 69.52 square kilometres (26.84 sq mi).

== Geography ==
Nagi is located in the northeastern part of Okayama Prefecture, bordered by Tottori Prefecture to the north. Located on the southern side of the Chugoku Mountains, mountains and forests occupy the northern town area; and the town is designated as a heavy snowfall area. Mount Nagi (1255 meters) from which the town derives its name, is located on the border between Nagi and Chizu, Tottori. The southern part of the city is a plateau called the Nihonbara Plateau, where the Ground Self-Defense Force Camp Nihonbara and the Nihonbara Maneuver Area are located.

=== Neighboring municipalities ===
Okayama Prefecture

- Mimasaka
- Shōō
- Tsuyama

Tottori Prefecture

- Chizu

== Climate ==
Nagi has a humid subtropical climate (Köppen climate classification Cfa). The average annual temperature in Nagi is 13.4 °C (56.1 °F). The average annual rainfall is 1,511.0 mm (59.49 in) with July as the wettest month. The temperatures are highest on average in August, at around 25.7 °C (78.3 °F), and lowest in January, at around 1.8 °C (35.2 °F). The highest temperature ever recorded in Nagi was 39.4 °C (102.9 °F) on 30 July 2025; the coldest temperature ever recorded was −15.5 °C (4.1 °F) on 3 February 2012.

Climate data for Nagi (1991−2020 normals, extremes 1977−present)
Month	Jan	Feb	Mar	Apr	May	Jun	Jul	Aug	Sep	Oct	Nov	Dec	Year
Record high °C (°F)	17.0 (62.6)	20.1 (68.2)	24.6 (76.3)	28.9 (84.0)	32.4 (90.3)	35.2 (95.4)	39.4 (102.9)	38.9 (102.0)	35.9 (96.6)	30.7 (87.3)	25.4 (77.7)	19.3 (66.7)	39.4 (102.9)
Mean daily maximum °C (°F)	6.8 (44.2)	7.9 (46.2)	12.1 (53.8)	18.3 (64.9)	23.2 (73.8)	26.2 (79.2)	29.7 (85.5)	31.2 (88.2)	27.0 (80.6)	21.3 (70.3)	15.2 (59.4)	9.2 (48.6)	19.0 (66.2)
Daily mean °C (°F)	1.8 (35.2)	2.6 (36.7)	6.1 (43.0)	11.6 (52.9)	17.0 (62.6)	21.0 (69.8)	24.8 (76.6)	25.7 (78.3)	21.6 (70.9)	15.3 (59.5)	9.1 (48.4)	3.8 (38.8)	13.4 (56.1)
Mean daily minimum °C (°F)	−2.7 (27.1)	−2.4 (27.7)	0.3 (32.5)	4.8 (40.6)	11.0 (51.8)	16.6 (61.9)	21.1 (70.0)	21.5 (70.7)	17.0 (62.6)	9.9 (49.8)	3.7 (38.7)	−0.9 (30.4)	8.3 (47.0)
Record low °C (°F)	−13.7 (7.3)	−15.5 (4.1)	−11.5 (11.3)	−4.4 (24.1)	0.8 (33.4)	6.8 (44.2)	11.8 (53.2)	12.8 (55.0)	5.8 (42.4)	0.0 (32.0)	−5.3 (22.5)	−11.0 (12.2)	−15.5 (4.1)
Average precipitation mm (inches)	60.3 (2.37)	67.5 (2.66)	105.1 (4.14)	120.1 (4.73)	157.3 (6.19)	191.3 (7.53)	253.4 (9.98)	147.5 (5.81)	172.6 (6.80)	103.8 (4.09)	67.8 (2.67)	64.5 (2.54)	1,511 (59.49)
Average precipitation days (≥ 1.0 mm)	9.6	10.2	10.9	10.2	10.7	12.0	12.8	9.7	10.5	8.0	7.7	9.2	121.5
Mean monthly sunshine hours	109.3	117.1	161.4	185.4	190.7	136.9	137.4	173.3	140.9	150.1	126.7	109.1	1,738.3
Source: Japan Meteorological Agency

== Demographics ==
Per Japanese census data, the population of Nagi in 2020 was 5,578 people.

Historical population
Year	Pop.	±%
1920	6,892	—
1925	6,794	−1.4%
1930	6,743	−0.8%
1935	6,626	−1.7%
1940	6,636	+0.2%
1945	8,761	+32.0%
1950	9,136	+4.3%
1955	8,925	−2.3%
1960	8,188	−8.3%
1965	7,401	−9.6%
1970	7,010	−5.3%
1975	7,716	+10.1%
1980	7,818	+1.3%
1985	7,905	+1.1%
1990	7,577	−4.1%
1995	7,230	−4.6%
2000	6,690	−7.5%
2005	6,475	−3.2%
2010	6,086	−6.0%
2015	5,906	−3.0%
2020	5,578	−5.6%
Nagi population statistics

=== Child subsidies ===
Nagi has attracted much international attention for its record high fertility rate of 2.95 children per woman in 2019. After the town recorded a fertility rate of 1.4 in 2005, the town implemented many policies and subsidies to encourage couples to have children, as well as attract families from around the prefecture. As such, the town's higher birth rate, coupled with the financial incentives on offer has led to Nagi being referred to as a ‘miracle town’.

Examples include:

- Grants for assistance with high school tuition and transport (240,000 yen/year for 3 years)
- Grants for childbirth (100,000 yen for each child)
- Free medical care for children aged 18 or under
- Free lunches for children in kindergarten, elementary, and middle school
- Day care for sick children

== History ==
Nagi is part of ancient Mimasaka Province. After the Meiji restoration, the villages of Kitayoshino, Toyota and Toyonami were established with the creation of the modern municipalities system on June 1, 1889. These three villages merged on February 1, 1955, to form the town of Nagi.

== Government ==
Nagi has a mayor-council form of government with a directly elected mayor and a unicameral town council of ten members. Nagi, collectively with the city of Tsuyama and the towns of Kagami and Shōō, contributes four members to the Okayama Prefectural Assembly. In terms of national politics, the town is part of the Okayama 3rd district of the lower house of the Diet of Japan.

== Economy ==
The main industry in the area is forestry and agriculture. Wasabi is a noted local product. The Higashiyama Industrial Park is located in the southeastern part of the city. Nagi is also highly regarded for its high-grade wagyu beef brand, Nagi Beef. The balance of richness and umami that comes from incorporating black beans into the feed led it to come in 2nd nationwide at the Wagyu Beef Prize Show in 2012. Other local specialties include taro and black beans.

== Culture ==
Nagi is home to Yokozen Kabuki, a form of kabuki that is known as noson kabuki, or farmers' kabuki. Also known as "jige-shibai," or underground theater, Yokozen Kabuki serves as one of the few forms of entertainment in farming villages, as well as a means of strengthening the bonds of the local people throughout the year. Performances of Yokozen Kabuki are held twice a year in Nagi, once at the kabuki stage at Matsugami Shrine. The elaborate rotating stage has been meticulously preserved, being designated as an Okayama Prefectural Important Tangible Cultural Property in 1963.

== Education ==
Nagi has one public elementary school and one public junior high school operated by the town government. The town has also garnered attention for its English language education, due to the town employing 12 Assistant Language Teachers (ALTs) from the Philippines to teach at the kindergarten, elementary, and junior high school. The town does not have a high school. Instead, students commute to the neighboring town of Tsuyama for high school.

== Transportation ==
=== Railway ===
The JR West Kishin Line runs on the south side of the town, and the Inbi Line runs on the west and north sides of the town; however, Nagi does not have any passenger railway service. The nearest train station is Tsuyama Station, which can be reached by bus.

=== Highways ===
Nagi is located on Japan National Route 53, and the Chugoku Expressway can be accessed through Tsuyama or Mimasaka Interchange, both about 20 minutes away by car. Highway bus from Osaka can reach Nagi after a transfer at Mimasaka Interchange using the Nagi Terrace Bus.

== Local attractions ==
Nagi MOCA (Museum of Contemporary Art)

- Working from a base proposal by famed architect Arata Isozaki, winner of the 2019 Pritzker Architecture Prize, Nagi MOCA is unique in that the museum and artworks were both simultaneously designed in a collaboration between the architect and the artists. The three installations include:
  - “Moon” - a minimalist room modeled after the shape of the crescent moon. The acoustics of the room lend to lingering echoes. The window of the room points to the moon at 10 pm on the Autumn Equinox.
  - “Earth” - a large “cave” that consists of curved rods coming out a bed of smooth rocks. Visitors are encouraged to walk along the rocks and contemplate the transience of life.
  - “Sun” - a cylindrical room modeled from the Ryoanji Temple in Kyoto. The curved floor purposely introduces disorientation. The sun shining through the circular film at the end of the room casts the room in a moody shadow. The room is very popular for taking photos for social media.

Bodaiji Ginkgo Tree

- The large 900 years old ginkgo tree at Bodaiji Temple, nestled up in the mountainside of Mount Nagi, is recognized by the national government as a natural monument and a prefecture-wide symbol for Okayama. According to legend, the influential Buddhist reformer Honen planted the tree when he began his initiation as a monk, following his statement that ‘learning begins from the roots’. 40m tall and 13m wide, the Bodaiji Ginkgo Tree is one of the Yomiuri Shimbun's Top 100 Famous Trees of Japan.

Mount Nagi

- Nagi takes its name from the nearby Mt. Nagi (elev. 1255m). Designated as a national park, Mt. Nagi is the second highest mountain in Okayama Prefecture. There are three climbing routes from Nagi Town to reach the 360 degree panorama from the summit.

Nagi Sanroku Yama no Eki

- A resort spot at 400 m with cottage facilities and a number of hands-on activities. It is also the best place to pick up souvenirs and local specialties, as well as eat a variety of international dishes at the restaurant on site.

Nagi Vicarya Museum

- Built to the shape of a shell, the museum exhibits the now-extinct vicarya (bikaria), a relative to today's sea snail. Fossils from 50 different species are presented across 300 displays, and outside the museum offers to dig for actual fossils from 16 million years ago.

== Festivals / Events ==
- Nanohana (Canola Flower) Festival (Mid-April)
- Yokozen Kabuki Spring Show (Late-April)
- Hotaru (Firefly) Festival (June)
- Nagi Summer Festival (August 14)
- Agriculture and Forestry Festival (September)
- The Forest Festival of the Arts Okayama (Every 3 years)
- Mount Nagi Trekking Event (October)
- Bodaiji Ginkgo Tree Illumination (October)
- Yokozen Kabuki Autumn Show (November)

== Notable people from Nagi ==
- Masashi Kishimoto, creator of the anime/manga series Naruto. The town of Nagi was the inspiration for the village of Konoha, where most of the protagonists of Naruto live.

== In popular culture ==
- Nagi Notes, 2026 drama directed by Koji Fukada
