= Japan National Route 179 =

Road in Japan

National Route 179
- 国道179号
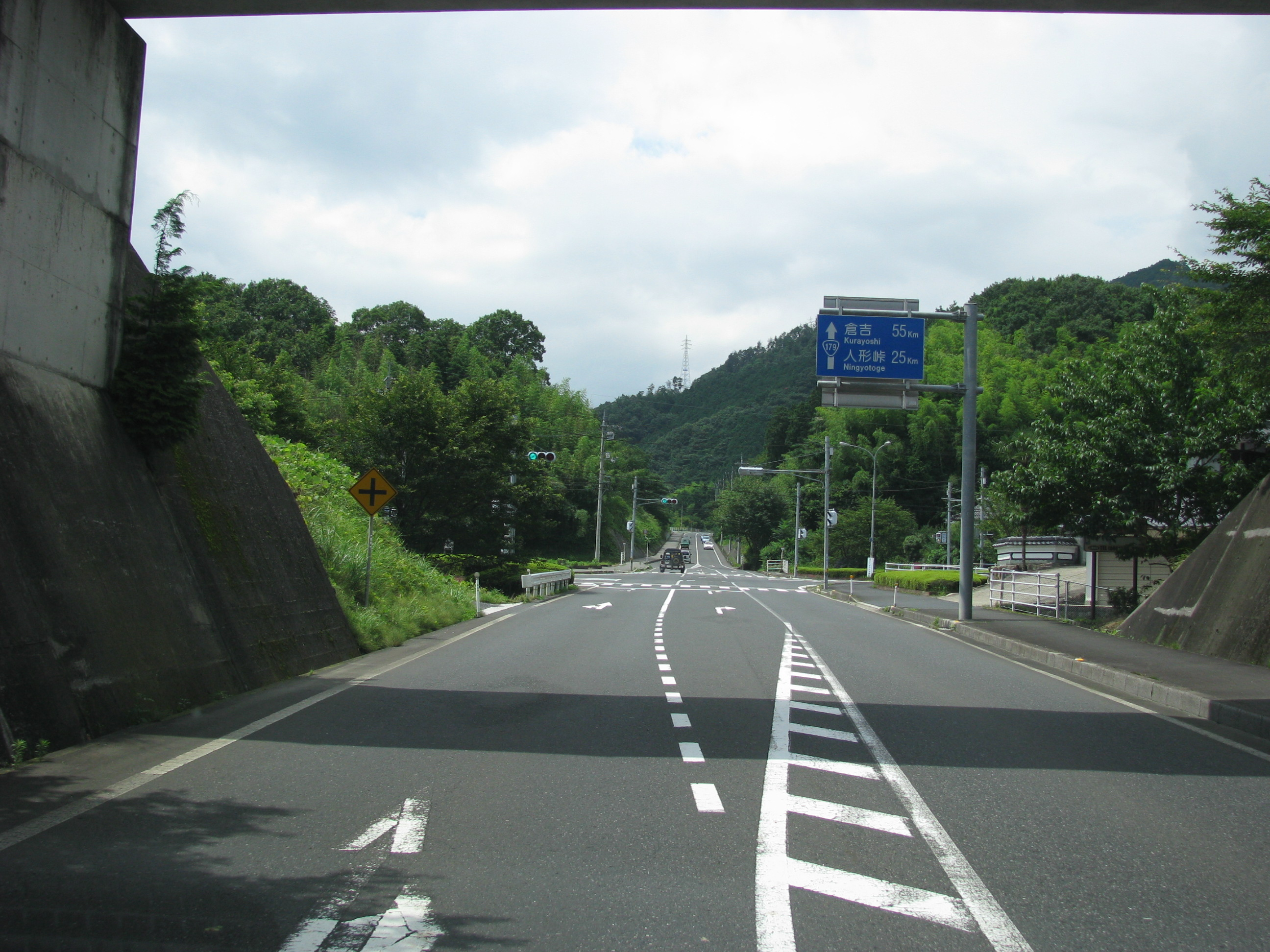

Route information
- Length: 158.7 km (98.6 mi)
- Existed: 1 April 1963–present

Major junctions
- North end: National Route 9 in Yurihama, Tottori
- South end: National Route 2 in Himeji, Hyōgo

Location
- Country: Japan

Highway system
- National highways of Japan; Expressways of Japan
← National Route 178	→ National Route 180

National Route 179 is a national highway of Japan connecting Himeji, Hyōgo and Yurihama, Tottori in Japan, with a total length of 158.7 km (98.61 mi).

== History ==
Route 179 originally ran from Tsuyama to Chizu. This was redesignated as Route 53 in 1963.
