= Katsuta District, Okayama =

District in Okayama prefecture, Japan

Coordinates: 35.110°N 134.162°E

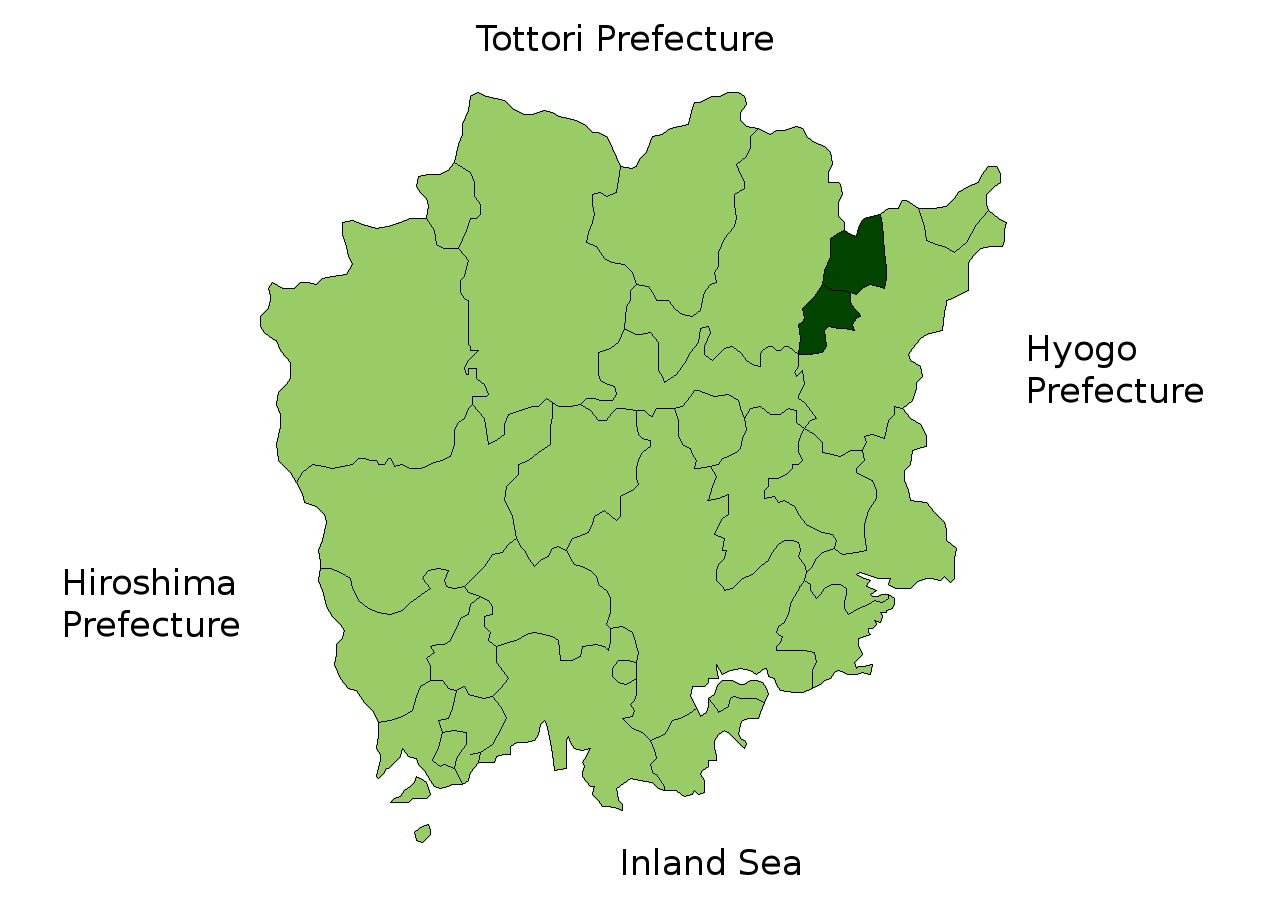
Location of Katsuta District in Okayama Prefecture

Katsuta (勝田郡, Katsuta-gun) is a district located in Okayama Prefecture, Japan.

As of May 1, 2004, the population was 17,888. The area is 123.63 km^{2}.

== Towns and villages ==
- Nagi
- Shōō

== History ==
Prior to February 28, Katsuta District consisted of:

- Katsuta
- Nagi
- Shōboku
- Shōō

As of 2003, the district had an estimated population of 29,056 and a density of 113.58 persons per km^{2}. The total area was 255.82 km^{2}.

- On February 28, 2005, Shōboku left Katsuta District and became part of the city of Tsuyama.
- On March 31, 2005, Katsuta left Katsuta District and became part of the city of Mimasaka.
