= Japan National Route 429 =

Road in Japan

National Route 429
- 国道429号
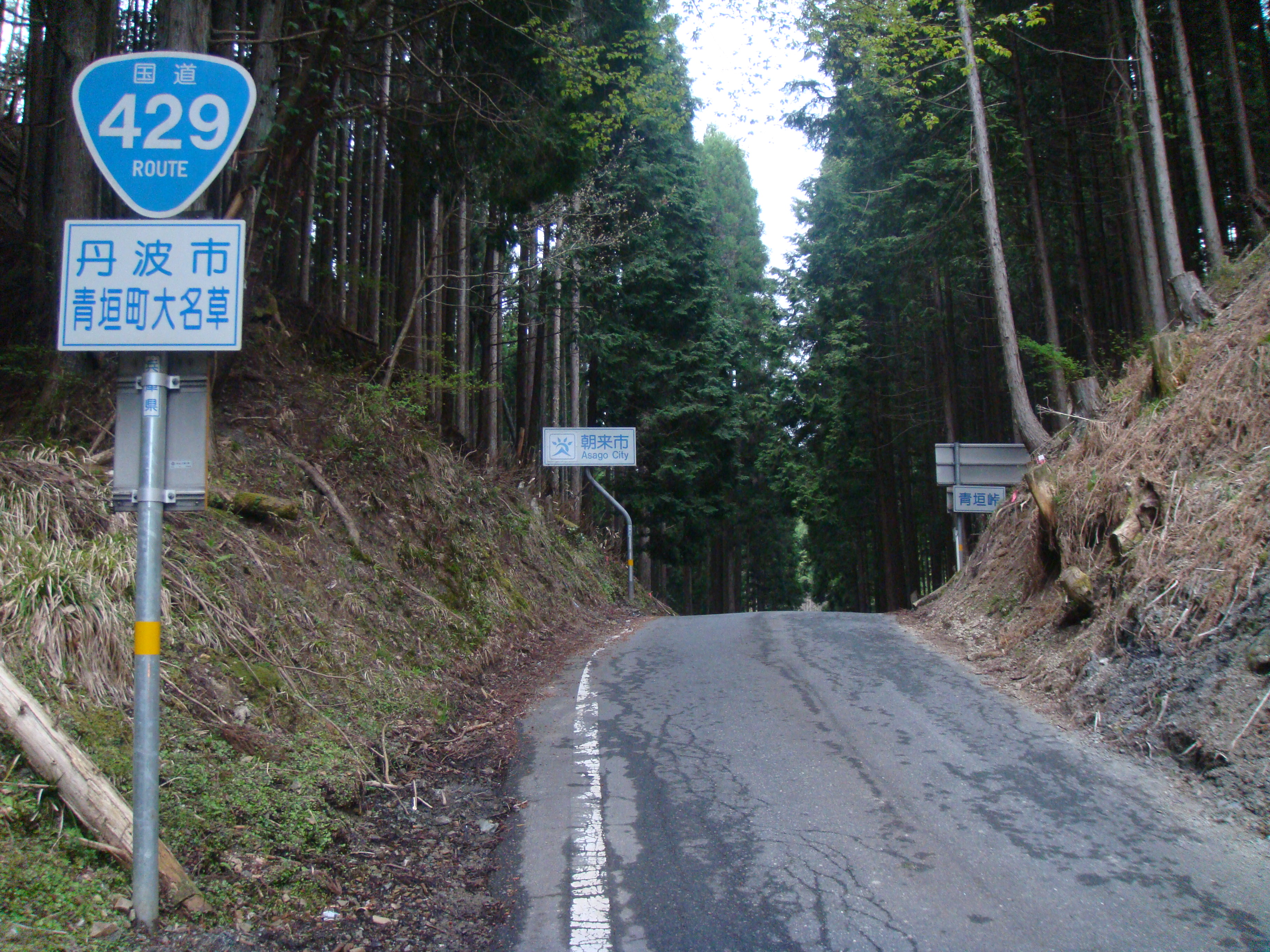

Route information
- Length: 254.4 km (158.1 mi)

Location
- Country: Japan

Highway system
- National highways of Japan; Expressways of Japan
← National Route 428	→ National Route 430

National Route 429 is a national highway of Japan connecting Kurashiki, Okayama and Fukuchiyama, Kyoto in Japan, with a total length of 254.4 km (158.08 mi).
