= Hirafuku Station =

Railway station in Sayō, Hyōgo Prefecture, Japan

Hirafuku Station 平福駅
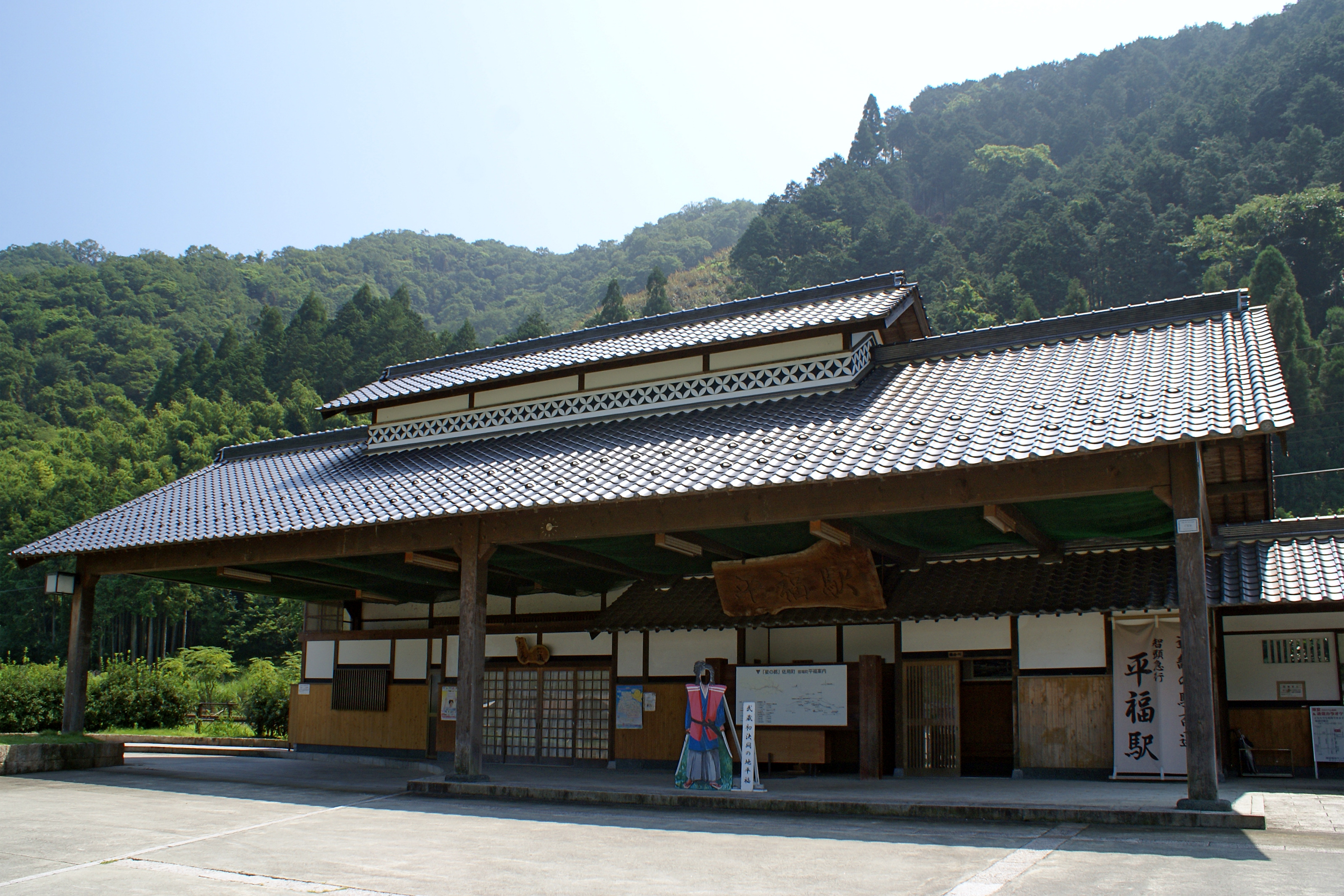
- Hirafuku Station in August 2006

General information
- Location: 382-3 Hirafuku, Sayō-chō, Sayō-gun, Hyōgo-ken 679-5331; Japan
- Coordinates: 35.0443°N 134.3719°E
- Operator: Chizu Express
- Line: ■ Chizu Express Chizu Line
- Distance: 22.5 km (14.0 miles) from Kamigōri
- Platforms: 2 side platforms
- Connections: Bus stop

Other information
- Status: Unstaffed
- Website: Official website

History
- Opened: 3 December 1994

Passengers
- FY2018: 26 daily
Location
- Location within Hyōgo Prefecture Location within Japan

Hirafuku Station (平福駅, Hirafuku-eki) is a passenger railway station located in the town of Sayō, Sayō District, Hyōgo Prefecture, Japan. It is operated by the third-sector semi-public railway operator Chizu Express.

== Lines ==
Hirafuku Station is served by the Chizu Line and is 22.5 kilometers from the terminus of the line at Kamigōri.

== Station layout ==
The station consists of two ground-level opposed side platforms connected to the station building by a level crossing. Platform 1 is the main line and is normally used for trains in both directions. Platform 2 is used only for changing trains and waiting for passing trains.

=== Platforms ===
1	■ Chizu Line	for Chizu, Tottori and Kurayoshi
2	■ Chizu Line	for Kamigori, Osaka, Kyoto and Okayama

== Adjacent stations ==
«	Service	»
Chizu Express
Chizu Line
Limited Express "Super Inaba": Does not stop at this station
Limited Express "Super Hakuto": Does not stop at this station
Sayo	Local	Ishii

== History ==
Hirafuku Station opened on December 3, 1994 with the opening of the Chizu Line.

== Passenger statistics ==
In fiscal 2018, the station was used by an average of 26 passengers daily.

== Surrounding area ==
- Hirafuku-juku on the Inaba Kaidō
- Hirafuku Folk Museum
- Rikan Castle ruins

== See also ==
- List of railway stations in Japan
