= Kōzuki =

Dissolved municipality in Hyōgo prefecture, Japan

Kōzuki (上月町, Kōzuki-chō) was a town located in Sayō District, Hyōgo Prefecture, Japan.

As of 2003, the town had an estimated population of 5,387 and a density of 58.76 persons per km^{2}. The total area was 91.68 km^{2}.

On October 1, 2005, Kōzuki, along with the towns of Mikazuki and Nankō (all from Sayō District), was merged into the expanded town of Sayō.
