= Mikazuki Domain =

Japanese feudal domain located in Harima Province

Mikazuki Domain 三日月藩
- under Tokugawa shogunate Japan
- 1697–1871
- Capital: Mikazuki jin'ya
- Area
  - Coordinates: 34°59′27.08″N 134°25′53.29″E
  - Type: Daimyō
- Historical era: Edo period
  - Established: 1697
  - Disestablished: 1871
- Today part of: part of Hyōgo Prefecture

Location of Mikazuki jin'ya
Mikazuki Domain (Japan)

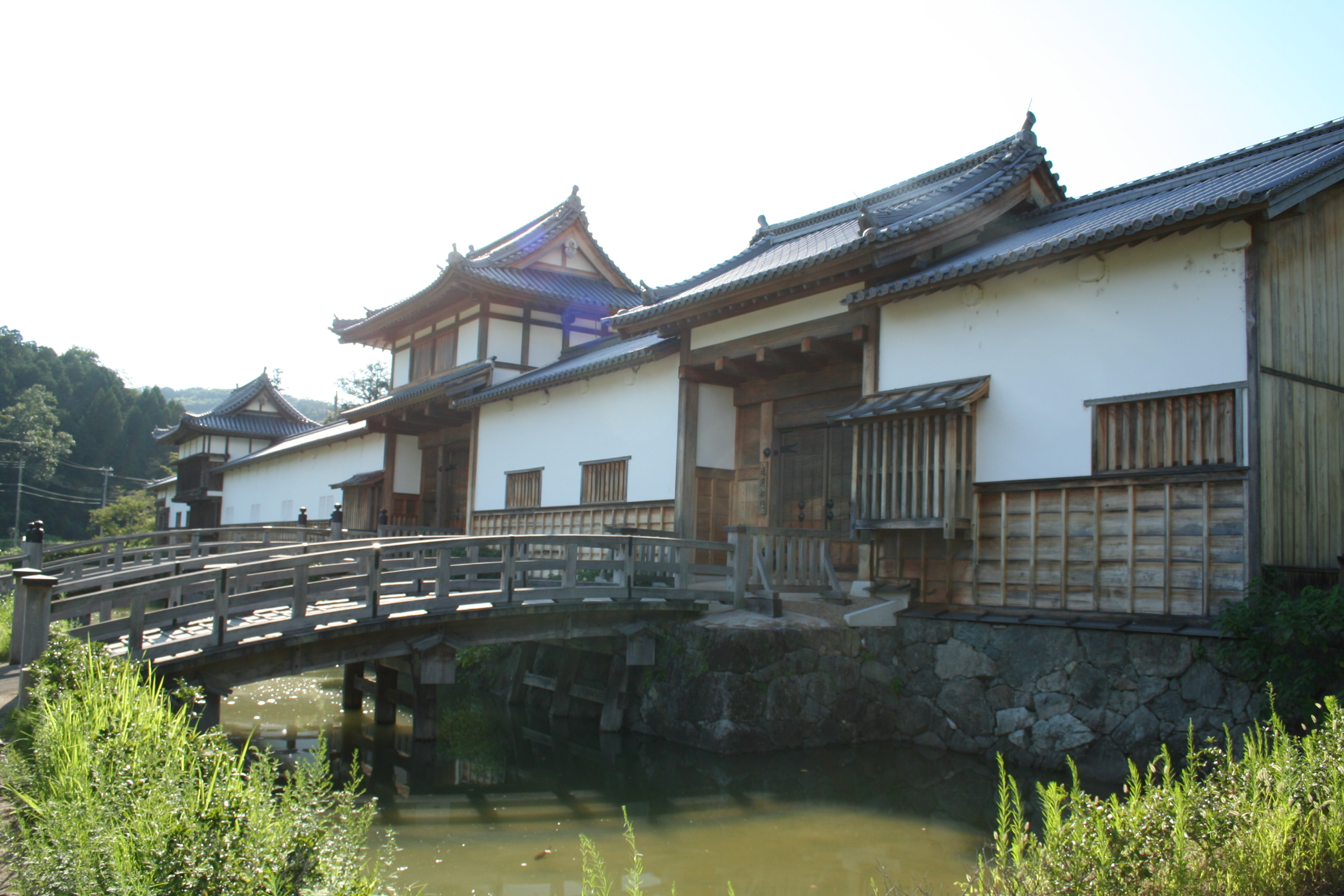
Mikazuki jin'ya

Mikazuki Domain (三日月藩, Mikazuki-han) was a feudal domain under the Tokugawa shogunate of Edo period Japan, in Harima Province in what is now the southwestern portion of modern-day Hyōgo Prefecture. It was centered around the Mikazuki jin'ya which was located in what is now the Mikazuki neighborhood of the town of Sayō, Hyōgo. It was controlled by a cadet branch tozama daimyō Mori clan throughout its history. It was also called Noino Domain (乃井野藩, Niono-han).

== History ==
In April 1676, the 2nd daimyō of Tsuyama Domain, Mori Nagatsugu, gave 15,000 koku of this holdings to his fifth son, Mori Nagatoshi, to create a cadet house. However, this subsidiary domain, Tsuyama Shinden Domain, did not receive official recognition from the shogunate until 1684. In 1697, the Mori clan were disposed from Tsuyama; but Tsuyama Shinden Domain was allowed to remain at its existing 15,000 koku as an independent domain called Mikazuki Domain. It survived nine generations, or 174 years, until the Meiji restoration. The 5th daimyō Mori Hayaatsu opened the han school, "Kōgyōkan". During the Boshin War, the domain quickly sided with the imperial government. In 1871, with the abolition of the han system, the domain became "Mikazuki Prefecture", which was merged with "Shikama Prefecture", which in turn became part of Hyōgo Prefecture.

The clan was ennobled with the kazoku peerage title of shishaku (viscount) in 1884.

== Holdings at the end of the Edo period ==
As with most domains in the han system, Mikazuki Domain consisted of several discontinuous territories calculated to provide the assigned kokudaka, based on periodic cadastral surveys and projected agricultural yields.

- Harima Province
  - 7 villages in Issai District
  - 40 villages in Sayo District
  - 18 villages in Shisō District

== List of daimyō ==
| # | Name | Tenure | Courtesy title | Court Rank | kokudaka |
|---|---|---|---|---|---|
Mori clan, 1697-1871 (Tozama)
| 1 | Mori Nagatoshi (森長俊) | 1697 - 1715 | Tsushima-no-kami (対馬守) | Junior 5th Rank, Lower Grade (従五位下) | 15,000 koku |
| 2 | Mori Naganori (森長記) | 1715 - 1739 | Aki-no-kami (安芸守) | Junior 5th Rank, Lower Grade (従五位下) | 15,000 koku |
| 3 | Mori Toshinobu (森俊春) | 1739 - 1774 | Aki-no-kami (安芸守) | Junior 5th Rank, Lower Grade (従五位下) | 15,000 koku |
| 4 | Mori Toshitsugu (森俊韶) | 1774 - 1793 | Kawachi-no-kami (河内守) | Junior 5th Rank, Lower Grade (従五位下) | 15,000 koku |
| 5 | Mori Hayaatsu (森快温) | 1793 - 1801 | Shimotsuke-no-kami (下野守) | Junior 5th Rank, Lower Grade (従五位下) | 15,000 koku |
| 6 | Mori Nagayoshi (森長義) | 1801 - 1809 | Kawachi-no-kami (河内守) | Junior 5th Rank, Lower Grade (従五位下) | 15,000 koku |
| 7 | Mori Nagaatsu (森長篤) | 1809 - 1816 | Tsushima-no-kami (対馬守) | Junior 5th Rank, Lower Grade (従五位下) | 15,000 koku |
| 8 | Mori Nagakuni (森長国) | 1816 - 1848 | Sado-no-kami (佐渡守) | Junior 5th Rank, Lower Grade (従五位下) | 15,000 koku |
| 9 | Mori Toshishige (森俊滋) | 1848 - 1871 | Tsushima-no-kami (対馬守) | Junior 5th Rank, Lower Grade (従五位下) | 15,000 koku |

== See also ==
- List of Han
- Abolition of the han system
