= Ishii Station =

Ishii Station is the name of two train stations in Japan:

- Ishii Station (Hyōgo)
- Ishii Station (Tokushima)
