= Rikan Castle =

Japanese castle

Coordinates: 35°2′48.7″N 134°22′45.38″E

- 利神城
- Sayō, Hyōgo Prefecture, Japan
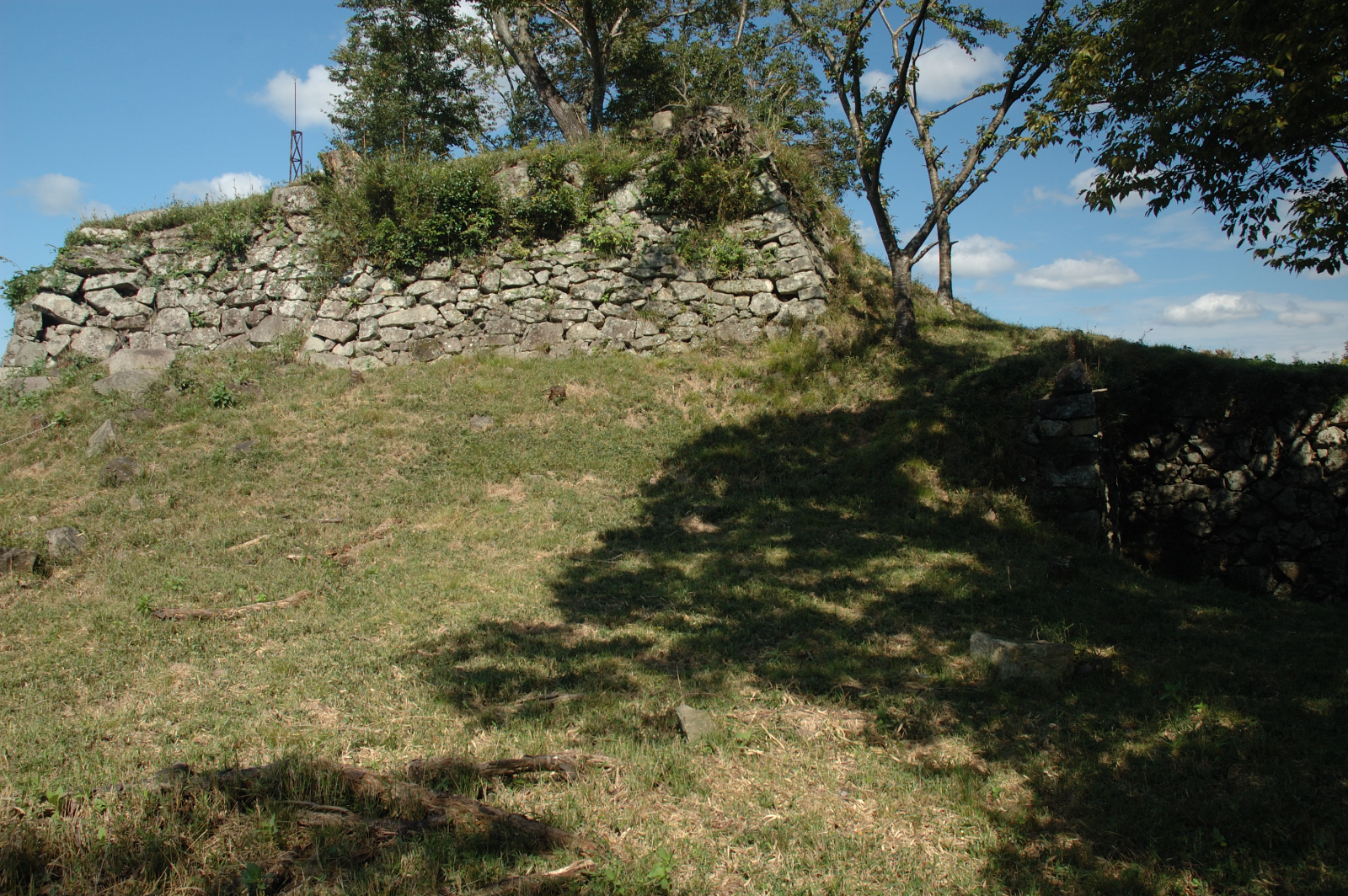
- Foundation stones of the tenshu

Site information
- Type: yamashiro-style Japanese castle
- Open to the public: yes
- Condition: ruins

Location

Site history
- Built: 1349
- In use: Nanboku-chō to Sengoku period
- Demolished: 1631

Rikan Castle (利神城, Rikan-jō) was a Nanboku-chō to Sengoku period yamashiro-style Japanese castle located in the Hirafuku neighborhood of the town of Sayō, in far western Hyōgo Prefecture, Japan. The ruins have been protected as a National Historic Site since 2017.

== History ==
Rikan Castle is located at the summit of the 373-meter Mount Rikan. It overlooks Hirafuku-juku, which prospered as a post town on the Inaba Kaidō, the main highway from Kyoto and Osaka to Inaba Province in western Japan. The Honmaru (inner bailey) occupied the summit and was protected to the south by the Ni-no-maru enclosure, the Ko-maru enclosure on the northeast, Osaka-maru enclosure to the west and San-no-maru enclosure to the far west. The first castle was constructed by Bessho Atsunori in 1349 during the Nanboku-chō period, and it was intended to protect the northern flank of Shirahata Castle, the main stronghold of the Akamatsu clan. During the Kakitsu incident of 1441, the Akamatsu and Bessho were both defeated by the Yamana clan backed by the Ashikaga shogunate; however, Bessho Harusada regained the castle in 1466. During the Sengoku period, when Hashiba Hideyoshi invaded western Japan on orders from Oda Nobunaga, he was able to take the castle without a fight as its defenses were betrayed by Bessho Shigeuji, who replaced his sickly elder brother as lord of the castle. However, in 1578 when Bessho Nagaharu of Miki Castle attacked Nobunaga, Hideyoshi responded with the Siege of Miki and the Bessho clan were destroyed. Rikan Castle fell into the hands of Ukita Naoie, a vassal of the Mōri clan. At the Battle of Sekigahara, Ukita Naoie was a general in the losing Western Army. The victorious Tokugawa Ieyasu awarded the castle (along with Harima Province) to Ikeda Terumasa. In 1601, Ikeda Terumasa distributed estates with a kokudaka of 22,000 koku to his nephew Ikeda Yoshiyuki, forming a cadet branch of the Ikeda clan. Ikeda Yoshyuki promptly renovated the castle with stone walls and a large three-story tenshu, all connected by corridors. He also built a daimyō palace at the base of the hill, a castle town and a tradesman's district along the highway. When Ikeda Terumasa returned a couple of years later, he was shocked at the magnificence of the castle and immediately ordered the destruction of the tenshu for fear that it would create hostility with the Tokugawa shogunate. In 1609, Ikeda Yoshiyuki was reassigned to Shimotsui Castle in Bizen Province, and in 1615, Ikeda Terumasa's sixth son, Ikeda Teruoki was assigned to Rikan Castle and established Hirafuku Domain, with a kokudaka of 25,000 koku. In 1631, Ikeda Teruoki inherited Ako Domain as his brother had died without a successor, he relocated his seat to Ako Castle and Rikan Castle was abandoned. Hirafuku Domain became tenryo territory administered by a hatamoto from the Matsudaira clan, who built a jin'ya in the post town.

At present, the stone walls of the castle ruins are in poor condition and there is a risk of collapse. Currently, it is possible to climb up to Sannomaru only when accompanied by a guided tour. Restoration work to stabilize the ruins began in 2015.

== Gallery ==
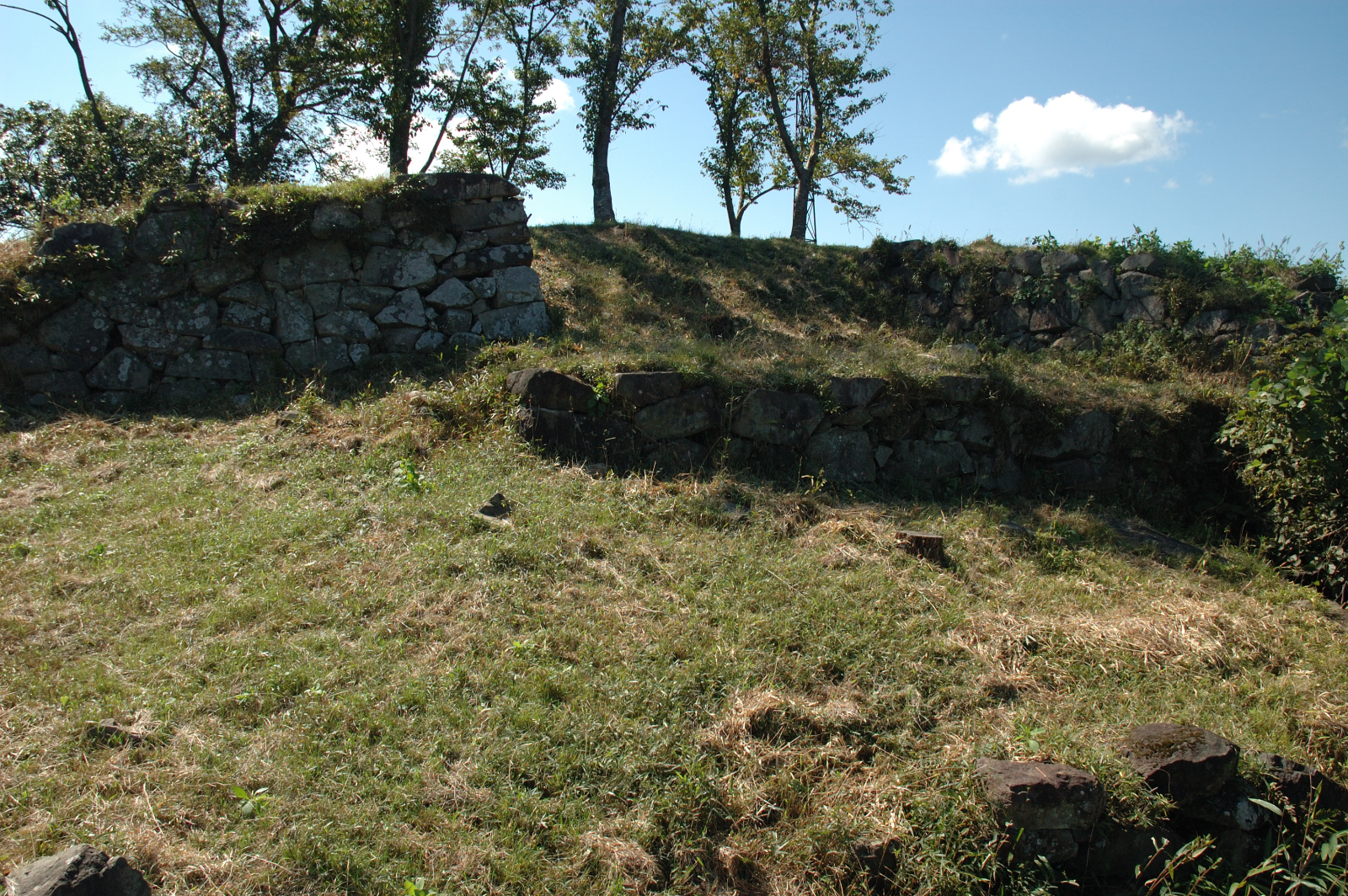
Stone walls at Rikan Castle

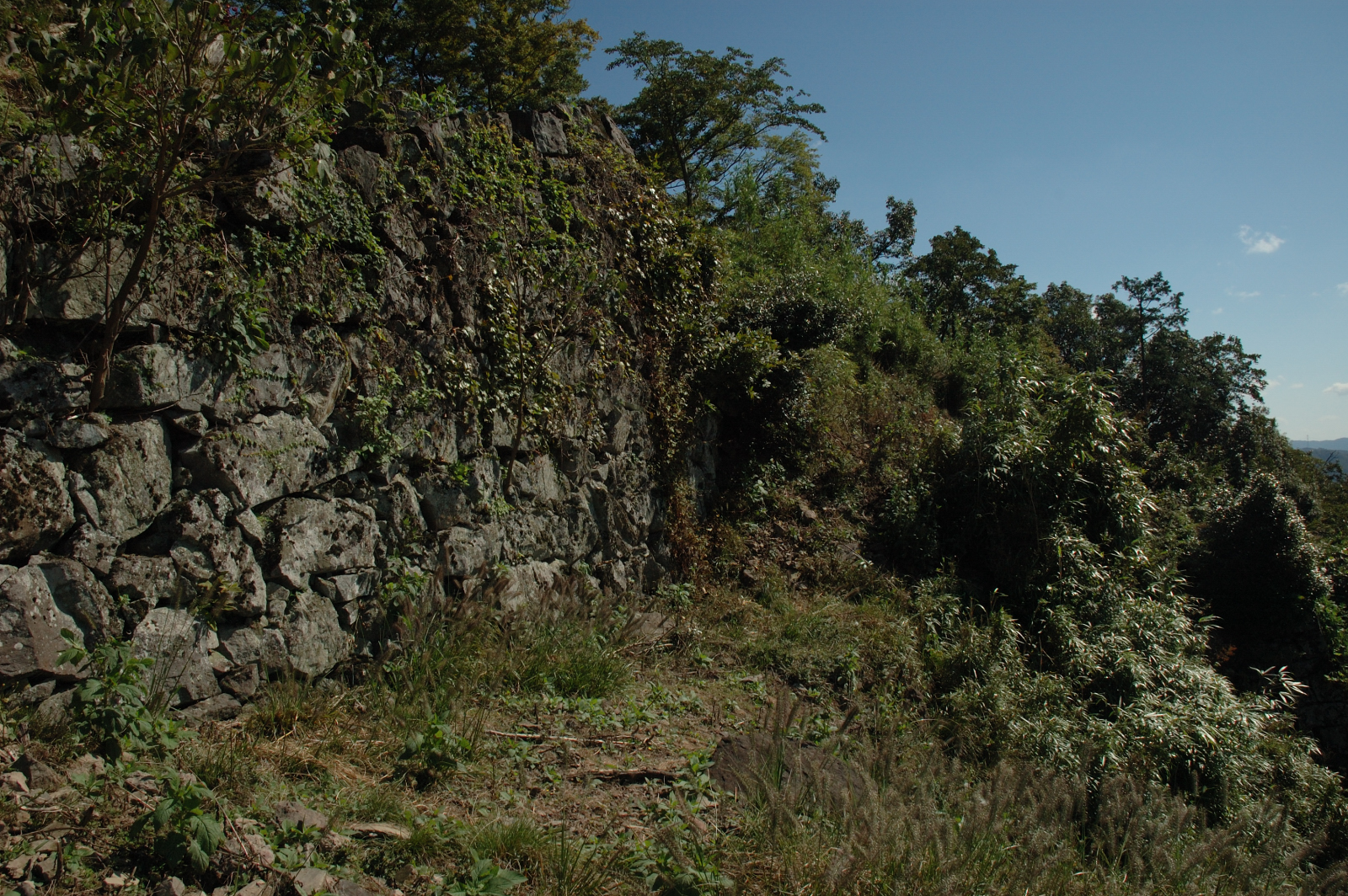
Stone walls at Rikan Castle

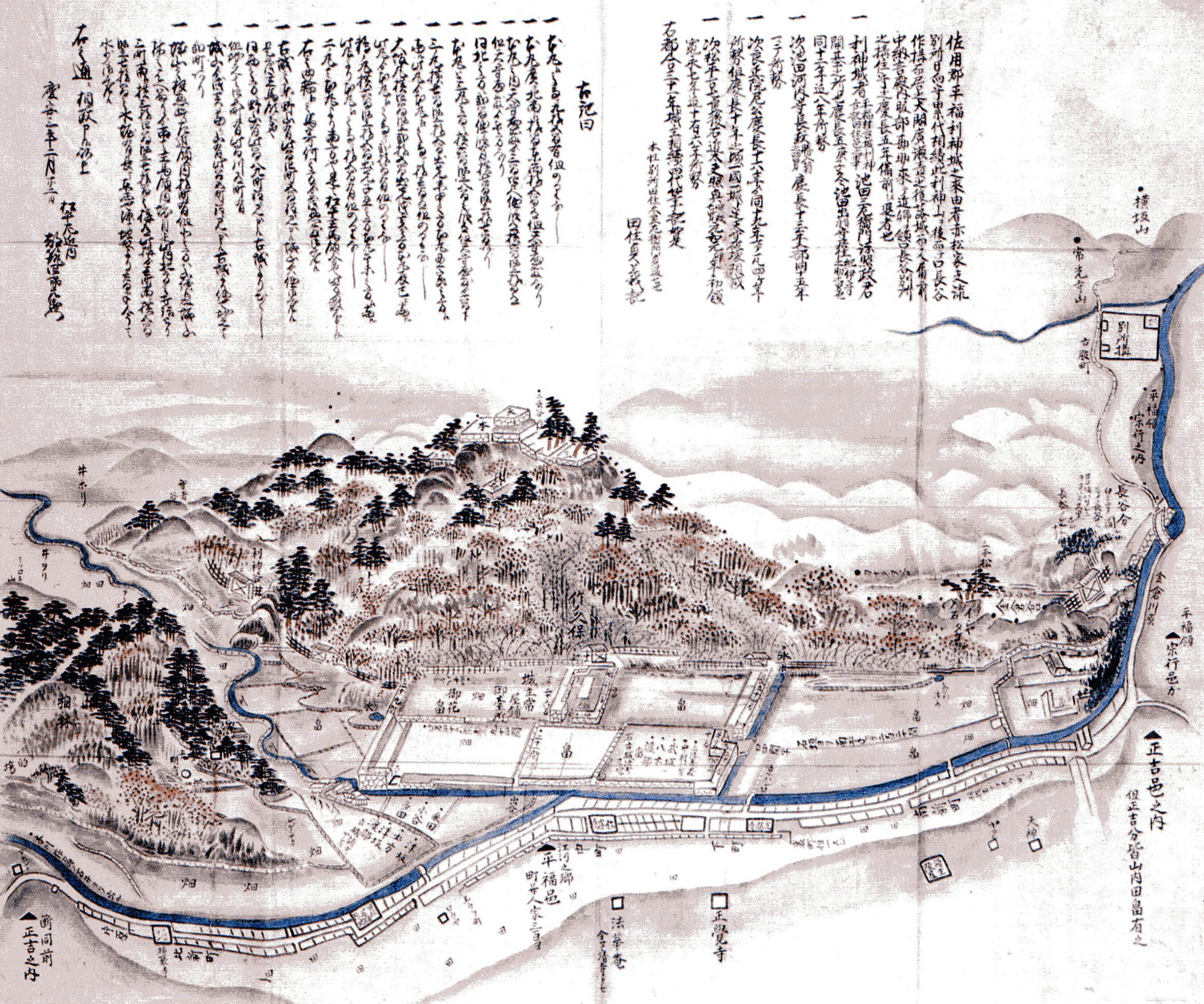
Contemporary depiction of the castle

== See also ==
- List of Historic Sites of Japan (Hyōgo)

== Literature ==
- De Lange, William (2021). An Encyclopedia of Japanese Castles. Groningen: Toyo Press. pp. 600 pages. ISBN 978-9492722300.
- Schmorleitz, Morton S. (1974). Castles in Japan. Tokyo: Charles E. Tuttle Co. pp. 144–145. ISBN 0-8048-1102-4.
- Motoo, Hinago (1986). Japanese Castles. Tokyo: Kodansha. p. 200 pages. ISBN 0-87011-766-1.
- Mitchelhill, Jennifer (2004). Castles of the Samurai: Power and Beauty. Tokyo: Kodansha. p. 112 pages. ISBN 4-7700-2954-3.
- Turnbull, Stephen (2003). Japanese Castles 1540-1640. Osprey Publishing. p. 64 pages. ISBN 1-84176-429-9.
