= Nankō =

Dissolved municipality in Hyōgo prefecture, Japan

Nankō (南光町, Nankō-chō) was a town located in Sayō District, Hyōgo Prefecture, Japan.

As of 2003, the town had an estimated population of 4,432 and a population density of 88.89/km^{2} (230.2/sq mi). The total area was 49.86 km^{2} (19.25 sq mi).

On October 1, 2005, Nankō, along with the towns of Kōzuki and Mikazuki (all from Sayō District), was merged into the expanded town of Sayō.
