= Sayō =

Sayō 佐用町
- Town
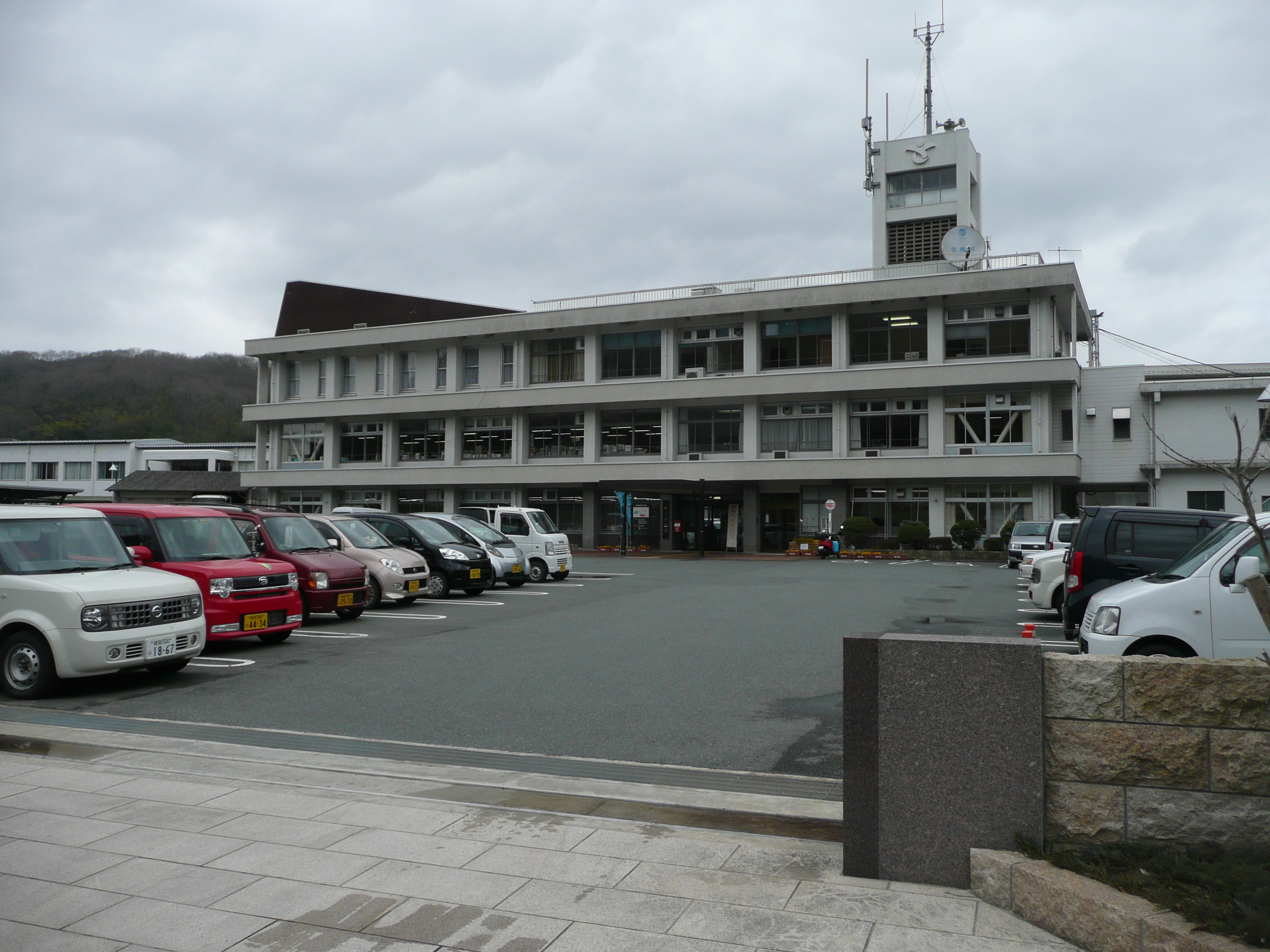
- Sayo Town Hall

- Flag Chapter

- Location of Sayō in Hyōgo Prefecture

- Location in Japan
- Coordinates: 35°0′N 134°21′E
- Country: Japan
- Region: Kansai
- Prefecture: Hyōgo
- District: Sayō

Government
  - Mayor: Noriaki Anzako

Area
  - Total: 307.44 km^{2} (118.70 sq mi)

Population (March 31, 2022)
  - Total: 15,701
  - Density: 51.070/km^{2} (132.27/sq mi)
- Time zone: UTC+09:00 (JST)
- City hall address: 2611-1 Sayō, Sayō-chō, Sayō-gun, Hyōgo-ken 679-5380
- Website: Official website
- Symbols
- Flower: Sunflower
- Tree: Ginkgo biloba

Sayō (佐用町, Sayō-chō) is a town located in Sayō District, Hyōgo Prefecture, Japan. As of 31 March 2022, the town had an estimated population of 15,701 in 6797 households and a population density of 51 persons per km^{2}. The total area of the town is 307.44 square kilometres (118.70 sq mi).

== Geography ==
Sayo is located in the southwestern part of Hyōgo Prefecture in the basin along the Sayogawa River in the Chikusa River system. Approximately 80% of the town area is occupied by hills and forests. In the early morning from late autumn to winter, there is often a fog called "Sayo morning fog".

=== Neighbouring municipalities ===
Hyōgo Prefecture

- Kamigōri
- Shisō
- Tatsuno

Okayama Prefecture

- Bizen
- Mimasaka

=== Climate ===
Sayō has a Humid subtropical climate (Köppen Cfa) characterized by warm summers and cool winters with light to no snowfall. The average annual temperature in Sayō is 13.8 °C. The average annual rainfall is 1488 mm with September as the wettest month. The temperatures are highest on average in August, at around 25.9 °C, and lowest in January, at around 2.6 °C.

== Demographics ==
Per Japanese census data, the population of Sayō has declined steadily over the 70 years.

Historical population
Year	Pop.	±%
1950	38,352	—
1960	32,455	−15.4%
1970	26,410	−18.6%
1980	24,874	−5.8%
1990	23,827	−4.2%
2000	22,337	−6.3%
2010	19,273	−13.7%

== History ==
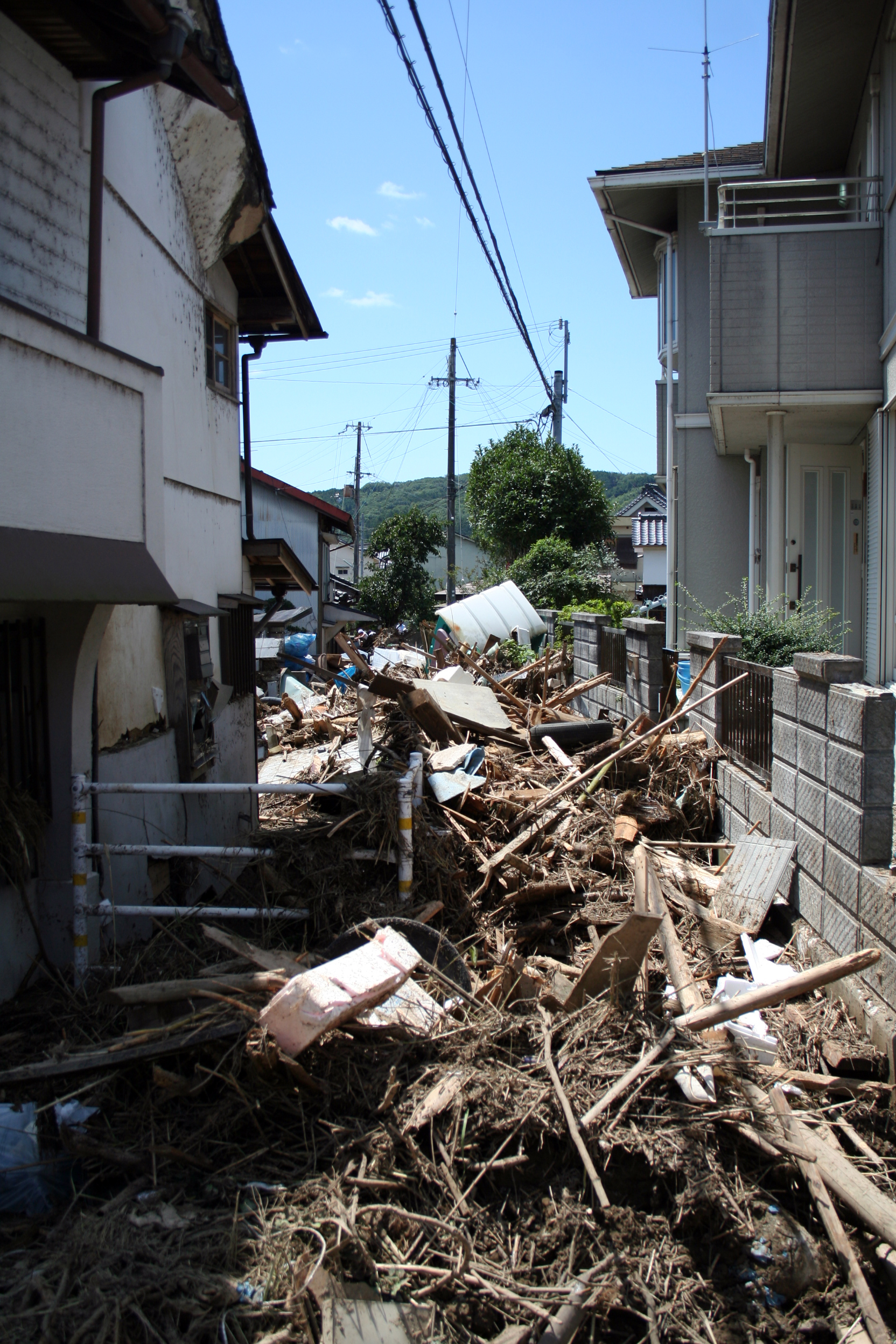
Debris in Sayo after Tropical Storm Etau

Sayō is located in ancient Harima Province, and the name appears in the Heian period Engishiki records. From the Kamakura period Hirafuku-juku prospered as a post town on the Inaba Kaidō, the main highway from Kyoto and Osaka to Inaba Province in western Japan, and in the Nanboku-chō period, the Akamatsu clan built Rikan Castle overlooking the town. In 1600, the Ikeda clan of Himeji Domain built three-story tenshu and established a cadet domain called "Hirafuku Domain" for Ikeda Teruoki. In 1697, the Tokugawa shogunate established Mikazuki Domain, who ruled parts of Sayō until the Meiji restoration in 1871. The villages of Sayo and Hirafuku were established with the creation of the modern municipalities system on April 1, 1889. Both were elevated to town status on October 1, 1928. On March 1, 1955, Sayo and Hirafuku merged with the neighboring villages of Ekawa, Ishii and Nagatani to form the town of Sayō On October 1, 2005, the towns of Kōzuki, Mikazuki and Nankō, all from Sayō District were merged into Sayō.

In August 2009, around a dozen people in Sayo are dead or missing as a result of flash floods due to Tropical Storm Etau, according to NHK. According to the Japan Times, 390 homes were flooded.

== Government ==
Sayō has a mayor-council form of government with a directly elected mayor and a unicameral town council of 14 members. Sayō, together with the city and district of Akō, contributes one member to the Hyogo Prefectural Assembly. In terms of national politics, the town is part of Hyōgo 12th district of the lower house of the Diet of Japan.

== Economy ==
Sayō has mostly a rural economy based on agriculture and forestry.

== Education ==
Sayō has four public elementary schools and four public middle schools operated by the town government and one public high school operated by the Hyōgo Prefectural Department of Education. There is also one private middle school and one private high school.

== Transportation ==
=== Railway ===
JR West – Kishin Line

- Mikazuki - Harima-Tokusa - Sayo - Kōzuki

Chizu Express – Chizu Line

- Kuzaki - Sayo - Hirafuku - Ishii

=== Highways ===
- Chūgoku Expressway
- Tottori Expressway
- National Route 179
- National Route 373}

== Local attractions ==
- Rikan Castle ruins, National Historic Site
- SPring-8, atomic physics research facility

== Gallery ==
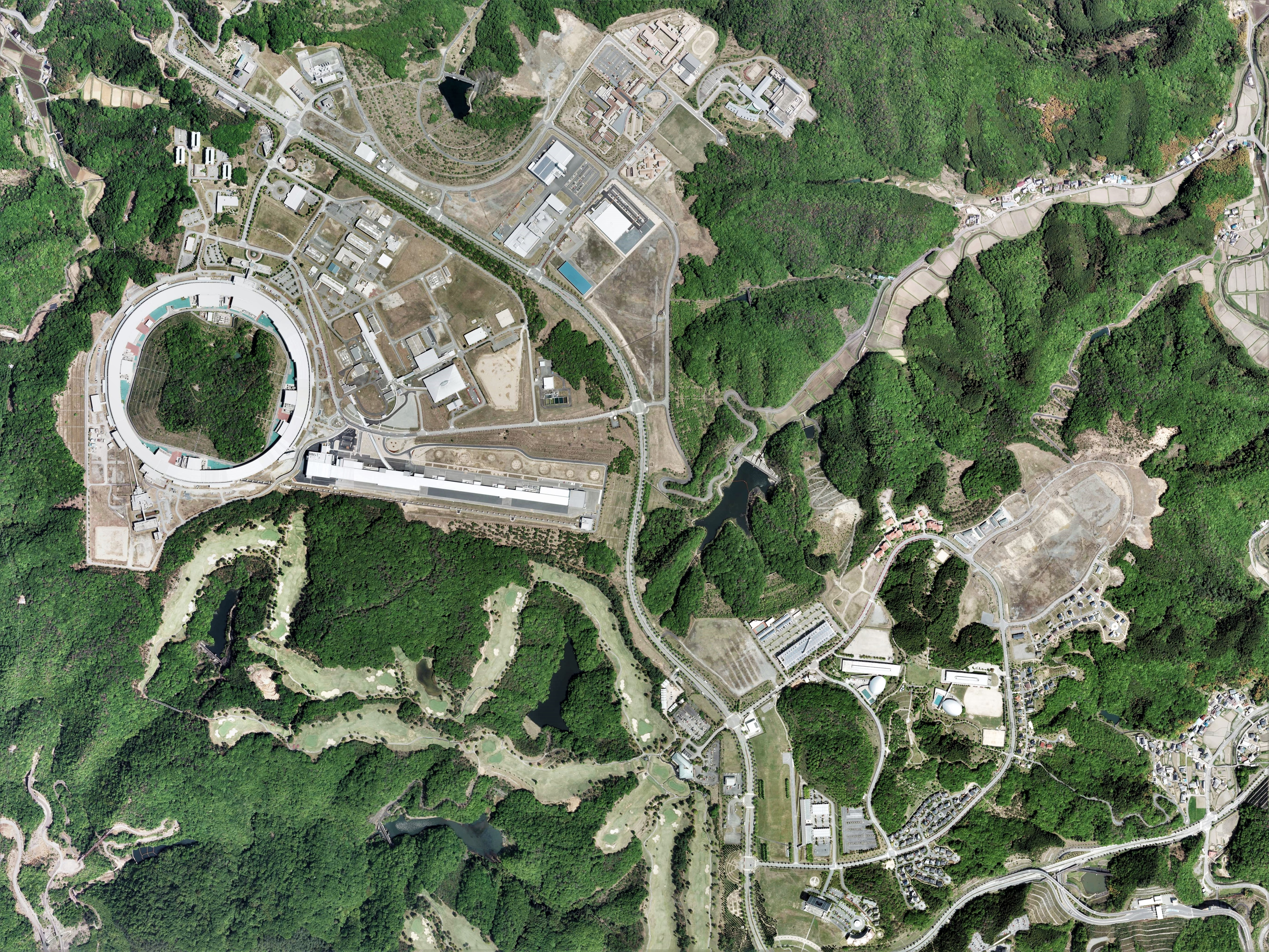
Spring-8

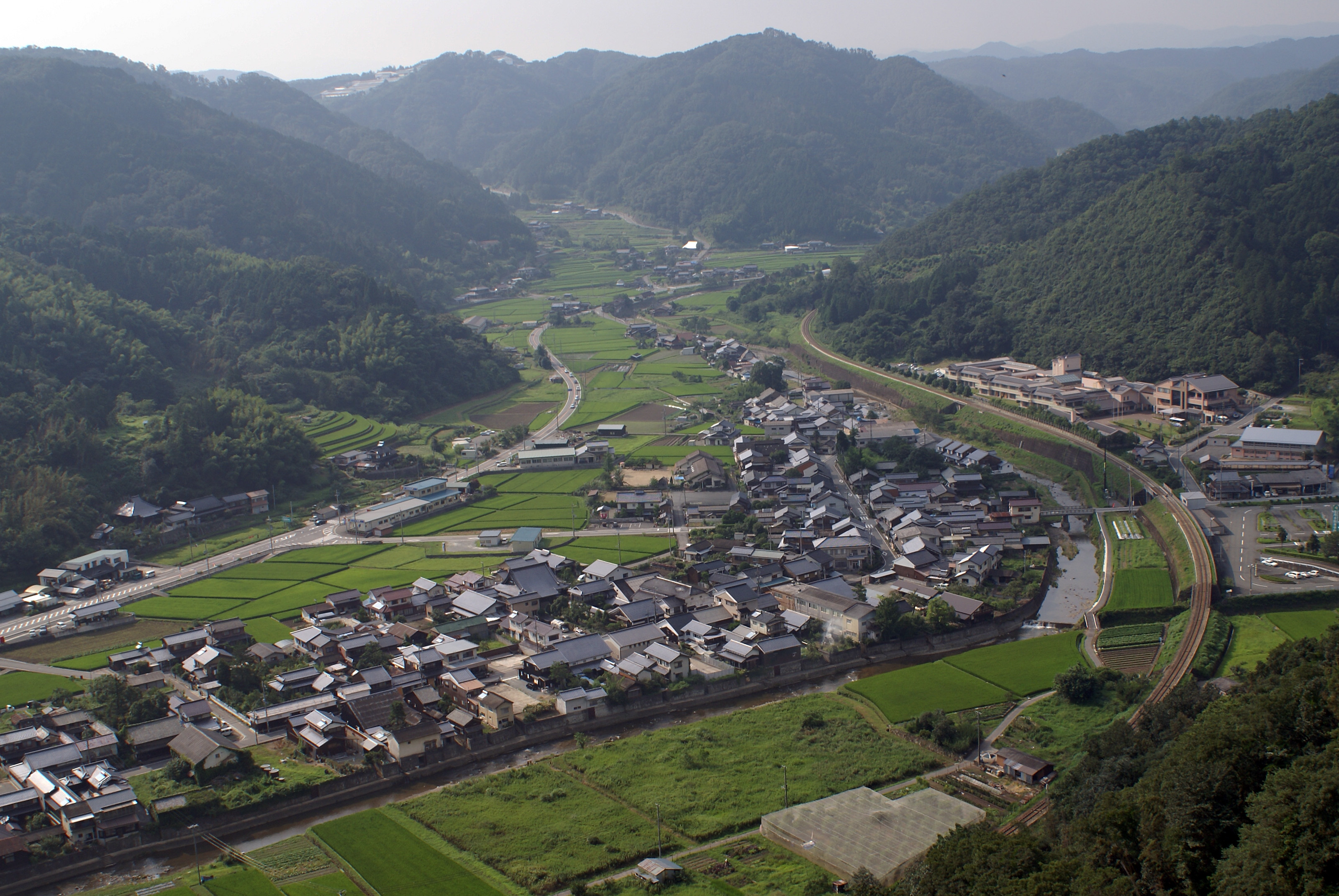
Hirafuku neighborhood

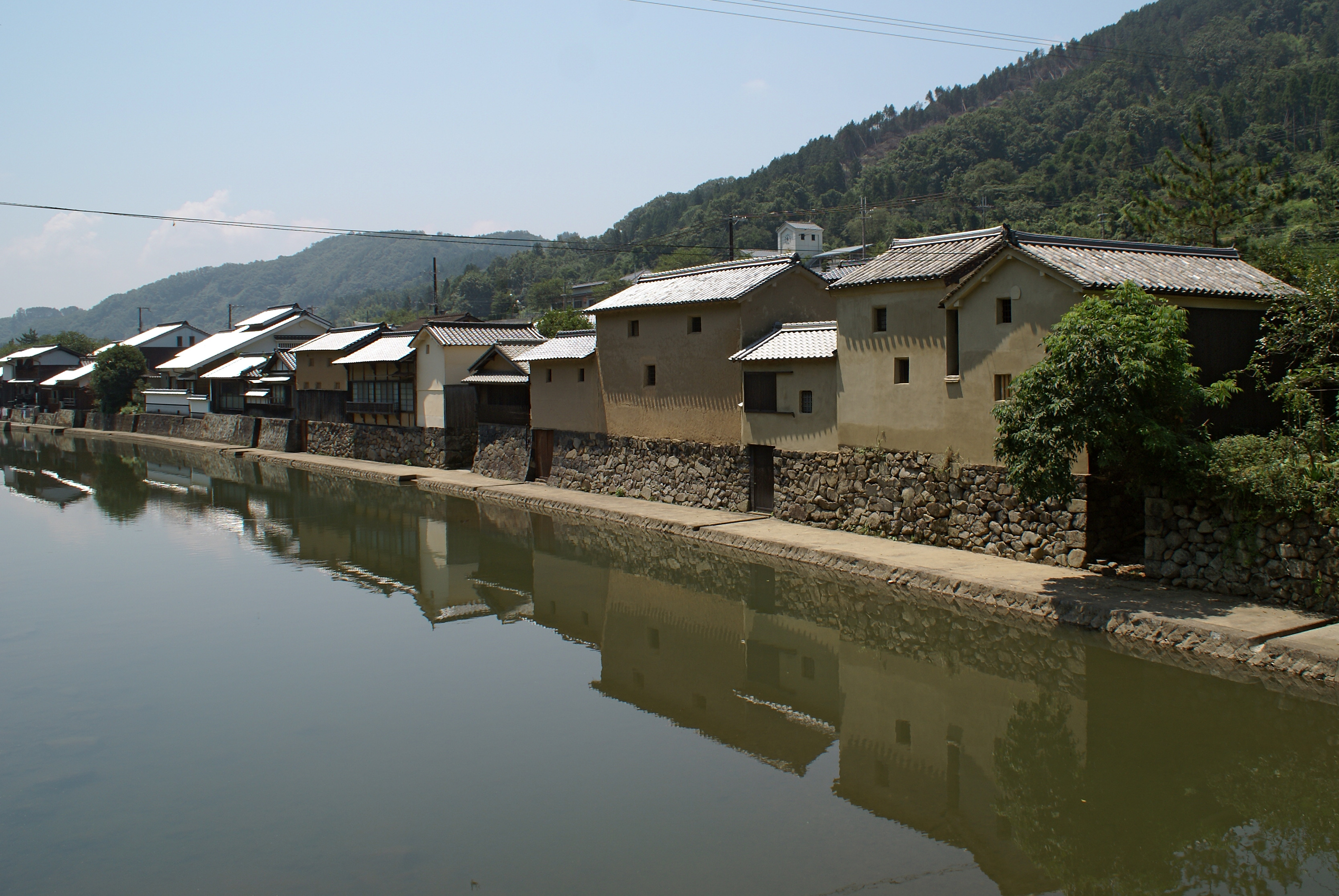
Hirafuku, scenery of the ridge of Sayō River

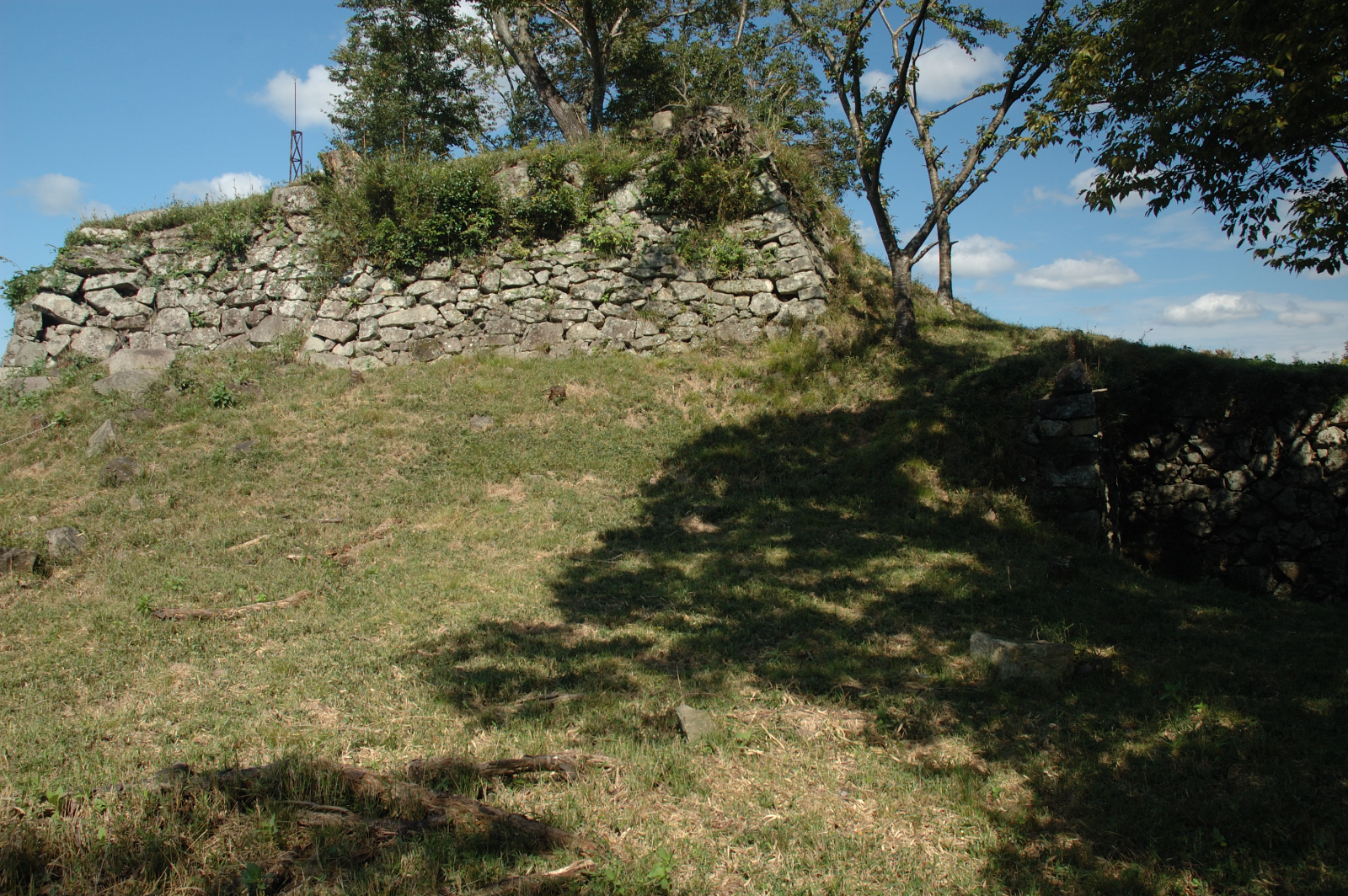
ruins of Rikan Castle
