= Ishii Station (Hyōgo) =

Railway station in Sayō, Hyōgo Prefecture, Japan

Ishii Station 石井駅
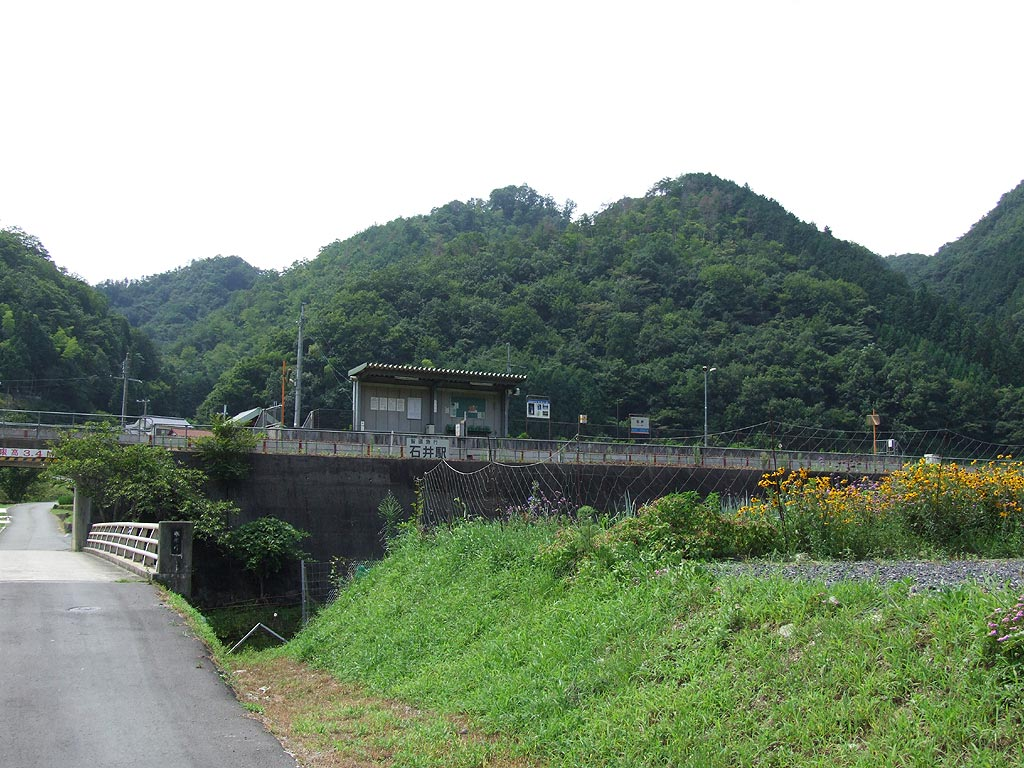
- Ishii Station in August 2008

General information
- Location: Shimoishii, Sayō-chō, Sayō-gun, Hyōgo-ken 679-5321; Japan
- Coordinates: 35.0816°N 134.3578°E
- Operator: Chizu Express
- Line: ■ Chizu Express Chizu Line
- Distance: 27.1 km (16.8 miles) from Kamigōri
- Platforms: 1 side platform
- Connections: Bus stop

Other information
- Status: Unstaffed
- Website: Official website

History
- Opened: 3 December 1994

Passengers
- FY2018: 5 daily
Location
- Location within Hyōgo Prefecture Location within Japan

Ishii Station (石井駅, Ishii-eki) is a passenger railway station located in the town of Sayō, Sayō District, Hyōgo Prefecture, Japan, It is operated by the third-sector semi-public railway operator Chizu Express.

== Lines ==
Ishii Station is served by the Chizu Line and is 27.1 kilometers from the terminus of the line at Kamigōri.

== Station layout ==
The station consists of one side platform serving a single bi-directional track on an embankment. The platform is on theft side of the track when facing in the direction of Chizu. It is connected to the log cabin style station building by stairs. The station is unattended.

== Adjacent stations ==
«	Service	»
Chizu Express
Chizu Line
Limited Express "Super Inaba": Does not stop at this station
Limited Express "Super Hakuto": Does not stop at this station
Hirafuku	Local	Miyamoto-Musashi

== History ==
Ishii Station opened on December 3, 1994. with the opening of the Chizu Line.

== Passenger statistics ==
In fiscal 2018, the station was used by an average of 5 passengers daily.

== Surrounding area ==
- Japan National Route 373

== See also ==
- List of railway stations in Japan
