= Mikazuki, Hyōgo =

Dissolved municipality in Hyōgo prefecture, Japan

Mikazuki (三日月町, Mikazuki-chō) was a town located in Sayō District, Hyōgo Prefecture, Japan.

As of 2003, the town had an estimated population of 3,305 and a density of 65.85 persons per km^{2}. The total area was 50.19 km^{2}.

On October 1, 2005, Mikazuki, along with the towns of Kōzuki and Nankō (all from Sayō District), was merged into the expanded town of Sayō.
