= Inaba Kaidō =

Road in Japan

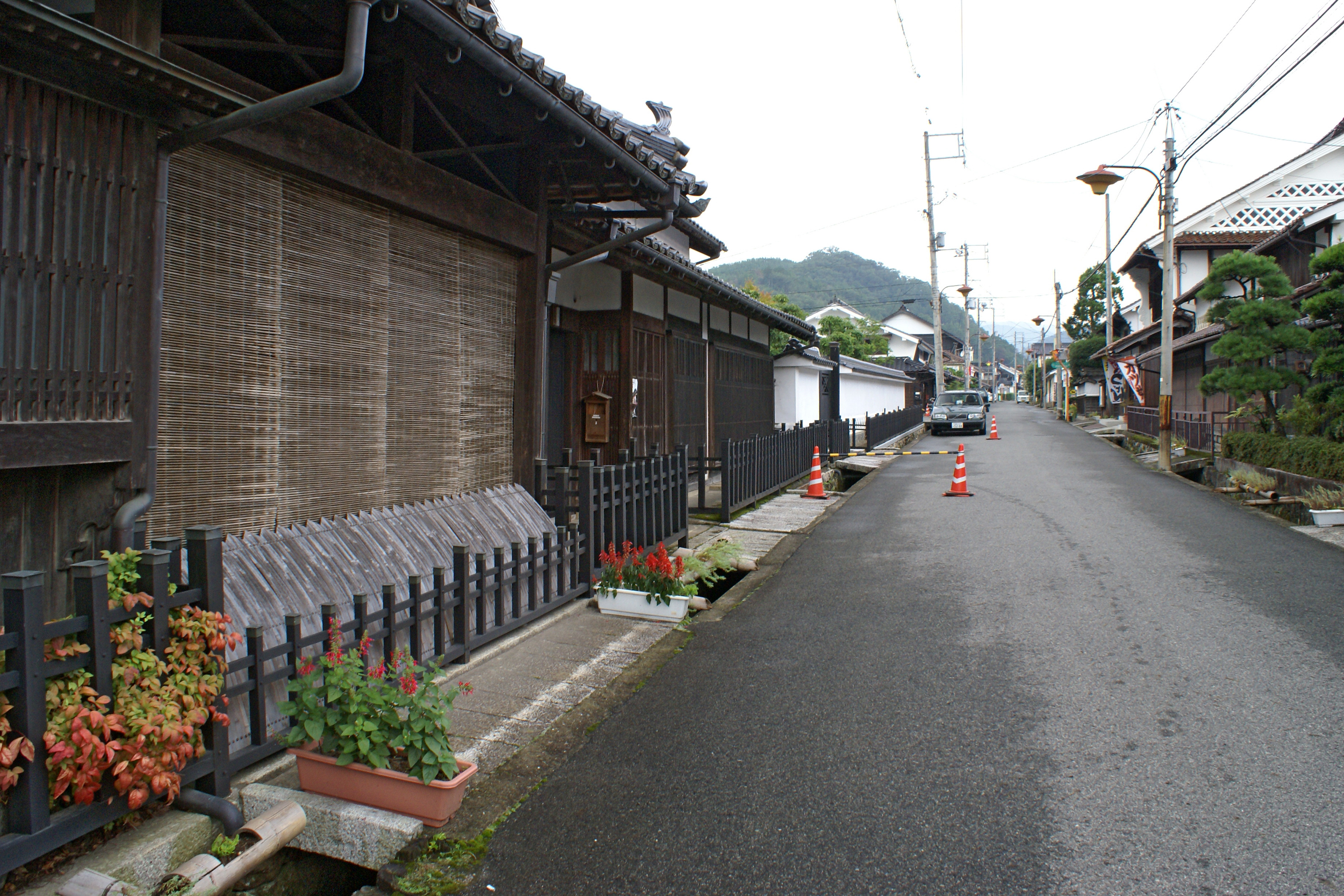
The Inaba Kaidō running through Ōhara-shuku

The Inaba Kaidō (因幡街道) was a route built during the Edo period in Japan. It started in Himeji, Harima Province (modern-day Hyōgo Prefecture), and stretched to Tottori, Inaba Province (modern-day Tottori Prefecture). There were eleven post stations along the route connecting to two cities.

The historical route is now traced by National Routes 2, 29, 179 and 373, as well as Hyōgo's Prefectural Route 724.

== Post stations ==
There are 11 post stations along the Inaba Kaidō. They are listed below with they corresponding modern-day municipality listed in parentheses.

=== Hyōgo Prefecture ===
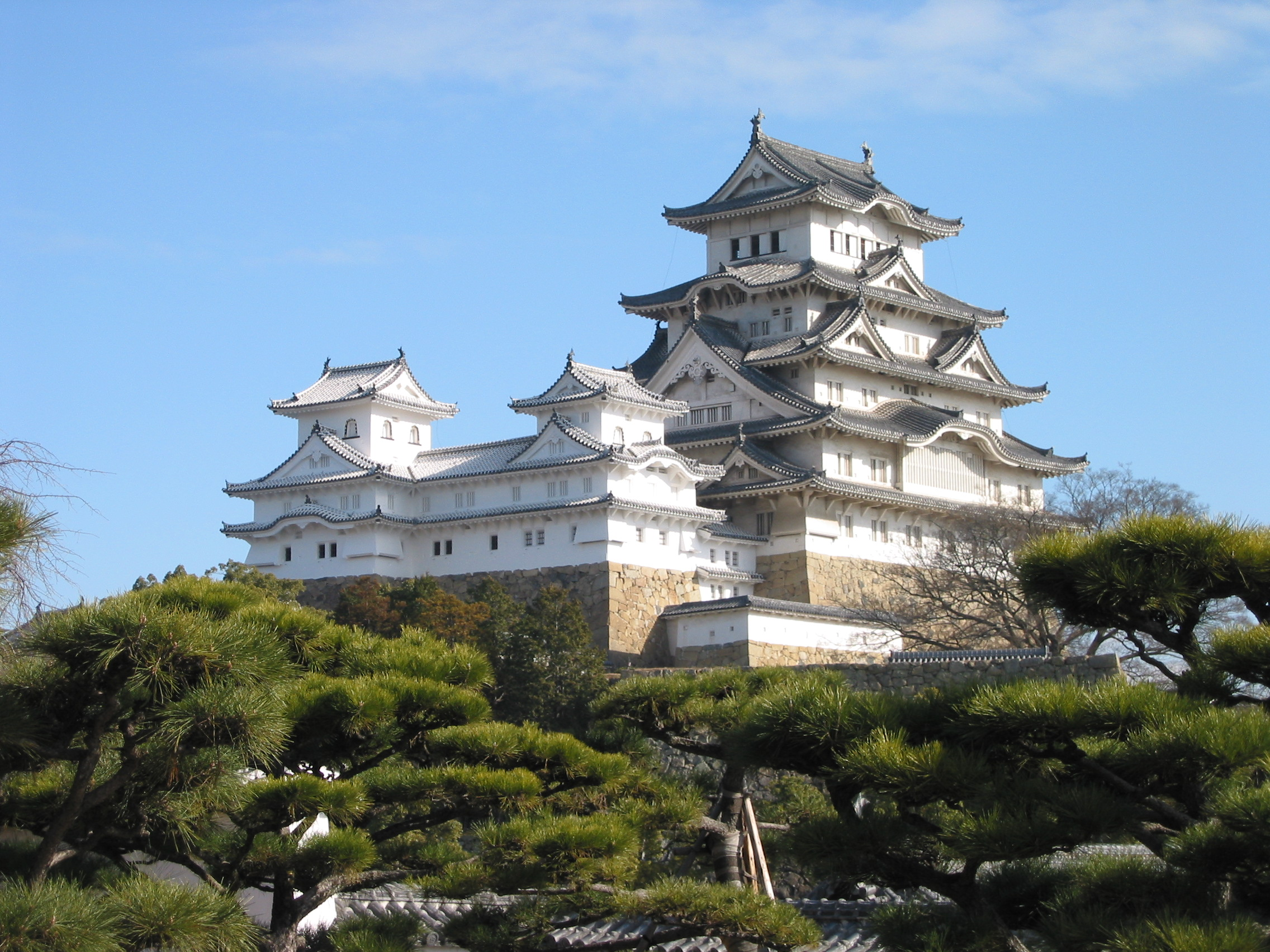
Himeji Castle

Starting Location: Himeji (Himeji)
1. Shikisai-shuku (飾西宿) (Himeji)
2. Hashisaki-shuku (觜崎宿) (Tatsuno)
3. Senbon-shuku (千本宿) (Tatsuno)
4. Mikazuki-shuku (三日月宿) (Sayō, Sayō District)
5. Hirafuku-shuku (平福宿) (Sayō, Sayō District)

=== Okayama Prefecture ===
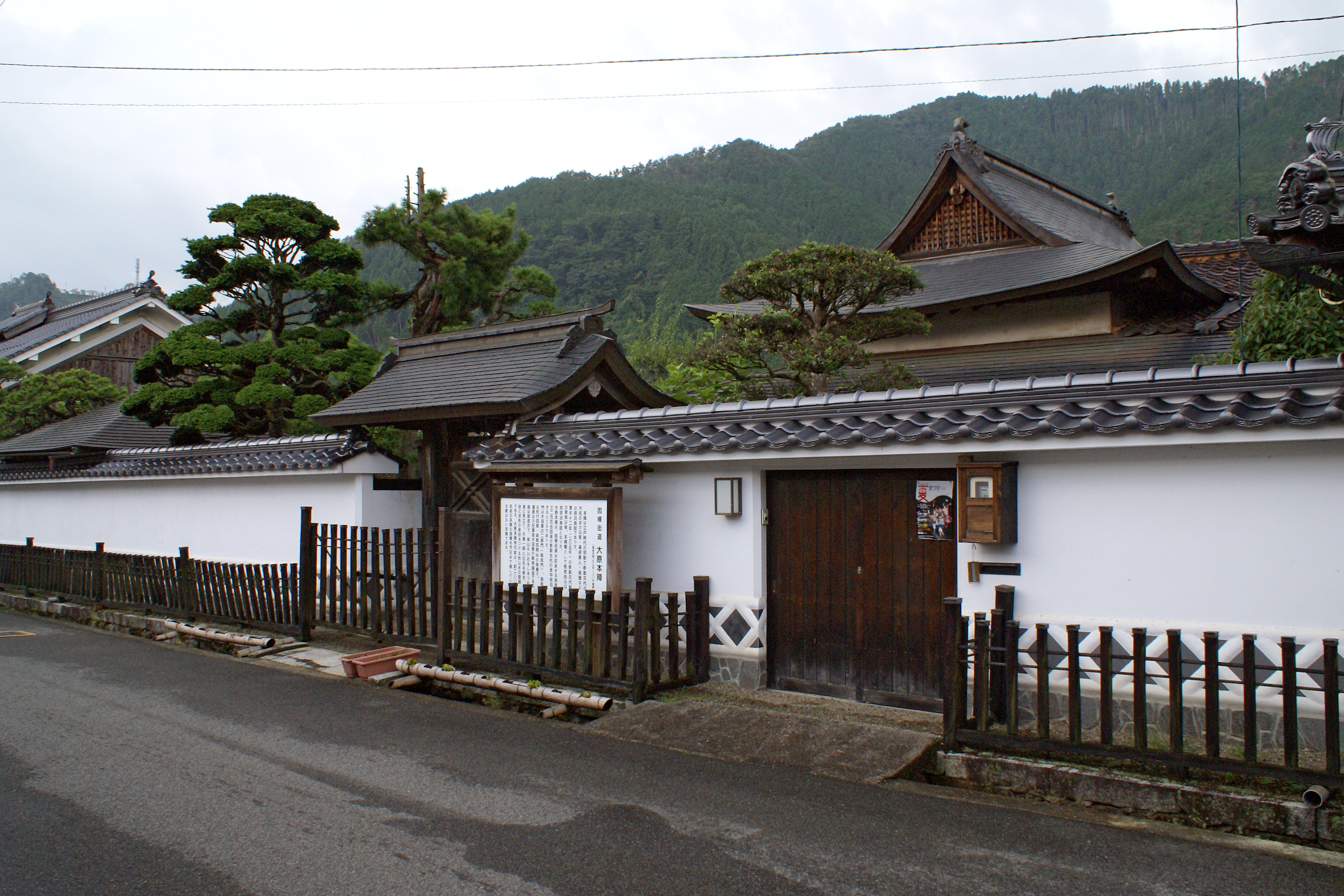
Ōhara-shuku's honjin

6. Ōhara-shuku (大原宿) (Mimasaka)
7. Sakane-shuku (坂根宿) (Mimasaka)

=== Tottori Prefecture ===
8. Komagaeri-shuku (駒帰宿) (Chizu, Yazu District)
9. Chizu-shuku (智頭宿) (Chizu, Yazu District)
10. Mochigase-shuku (用瀬宿) (Tottori)
11. Kawara-shuku (河原宿) (Tottori)
Ending Location: Tottori (Tottori)

== See also ==
- Kaidō
