= Foundation of the Covenant =

The Foundation of the Covenant (Socle de l'Alliance, 契約の台座) has been established in Liergues since March 11, 2020, in front of the main entrance of the Château de l'Eclair. It is dedicated to the victims of the 2011 Tōhoku earthquake and tsunami (Japan, March 11, 2011), and was inaugurated under the auspices of Mimasaka Province (Mayor Seiji Hagiwara) and in the presence of Senator Élisabeth Lamure.

== Building ==
The Foundation of the Covenant links the Porte des Pierres Dorées with the 32 municipalities of the Community of Communes des Pierres Dorées within the Auvergne Rhône-Alpes region, with the Okayama Prefecture, city of Mimasaka in Japan. Along with the Heiho Niten Ichi Ryu Memorial located in Gleizé, the Foundation of the Covenant also includes the urban community Villefranche-Beaujolais-Saône.

The flags of Ōhara-chō, Mimasaka, Auvergne Rhône-Alpes Dauphiné Savoie, Liergues and the Reiwa flag wave permanently.

Furthermore, the building celebrates the anniversary of 4 events:

- The 150th anniversary of the peace relations of Japan and France 1858-2018 that began when Mr. Gustave Duchesne de Bellecourt brought the Franco-Japanese treaty ratified on February 4, 1860, to the Shogun.
- Miyamoto Musashi's birthday. He was born in Ōhara-Chō on the 12th day of the third month of the 12th year of the Tenshō Era.
- The story of Kikou Yamata (Franco-Japanese writer) that recalls the first exchanges of his father, Mr. Tadazumi Yamada, 1st Chancellor of Japan, and Mr. Louis Émile Michallet, 1st Consul General in France, Founder of the Lyon-Japan Club, who subsequently authenticated the establishment and action of the Heihō Niten Ichi Ryu Memorial (Heihō kadensho).

== Articles ==
- Magokoro
- Mimasaka
- Tōhoku earthquake and tsunami

== Notes ==
- (es) Translate from Spanish Wikipedia article, El Zócalo de la Alianza.
