= Aurore de Lafond de Fénion =

French painter

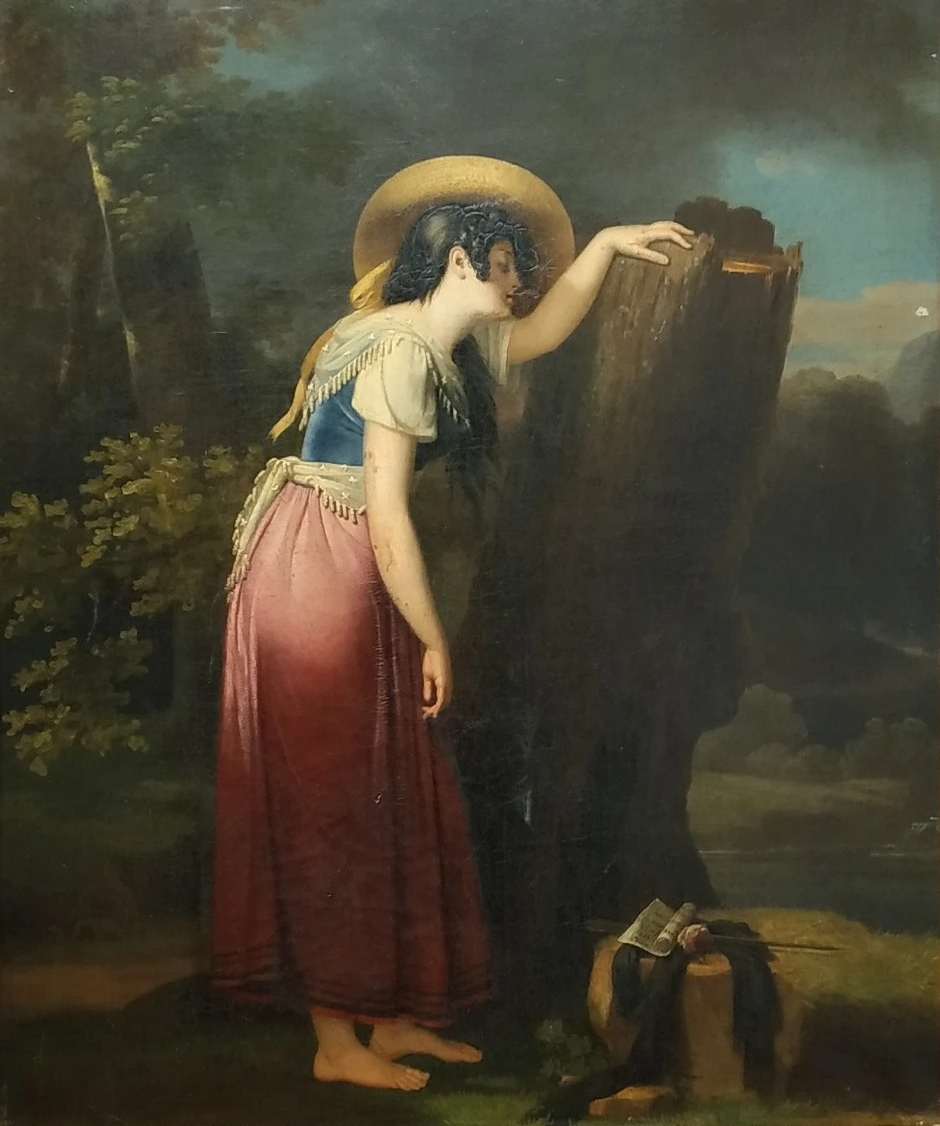
Fleurette at the fountain of Garenne, painting by Aurore de Lafond de Fénion, Salon of 1822

Aurore-Étiennette de Lafond de Fénion (1788–1859) was a French history and genre painter active during the Napoleonic period and the Bourbon Restoration. She was known for her sentimental historical scenes, royalist subjects, and domestic genre painting. She exhibited regularly at the Paris Salon between 1812 and 1822 and received several medals at provincial and national exhibitions.

== Life ==
Aure Étiennette de Lafond was born on 17 February 1788 in Saint-Maixent-l’École, in the department of Deux-Sèvres, to Jean-François-Bruno de Lafond and Marie-Anne-Antoinette Mollière de Favreuille. She was baptised the same day at the church of Saint-Léger. She later settled in Paris, where she studied academic figure painting under Jean-Baptiste Regnault.

During her career she worked under several professional names, exhibiting first as Delafond and later as Lafond de Fénion. She lived and maintained her studio on the Left Bank of the Seine in the 6th and 7th arrondissements of Paris, notably at rue des Marais-Saint-Germain - today rue Visconti, rue Guénégaud, and later rue de Bac.

In June 1834 she married Jean-Léon Le Prevost.

Lafond de Fénion's career coincided with the Bourbon Restoration, and several of her most important works were connected to royalist memory and Bourbon patronage, particularly through the Duchess of Berry.

She died on 5 November 1859 in the institution run by the Sisters of the Holy Family of Liergues.

== Works ==
Lafond de Fénion worked primarily in history painting and genre scenes, often mixing sentimental narrative, domestic imagery, and political symbolism. Her work reflects the post-Revolutionary taste for moralised historical subjects and scenes of royalist loyalty, particularly those associated with the Vendée and the Bourbon family.

She achieved notable success in both Paris and the provinces. In 1820 she received a medal in Douai, followed in 1822 by a gold medal at the Musée Royal and an honourable mention in Lille. In 1825 she received a second medal in Douai.

At least one of her works entered the collection of Marie-Caroline, Duchess of Berry, one of the most important female patrons of the Restoration.

== Salon Exhibitions ==
Paris 1812

- La Fidélité

Paris 1814

- Portrait en pied d’un garde d’honneur

Paris 1817

- Une scène maternelle
- Portrait de femme

Paris 1819

- Clotilde de Vallon-Chalys, poétesse du XVe siècle
- Portrait d’homme

Paris 1822

- S.A.R. Madame la duchesse de Berry au berceau de sa fille, alors âgée de neuf mois (property of the Duchess of Berry)
- Fleurette à la fontaine de la Garenne
- La Veuve du Vendéen

Paris 1824

- Fleurette et Henri à la fontaine de la Garenne
- La Veuve du Vendéen
