= Jarnioux =

- Part of Porte des Pierres Dorées
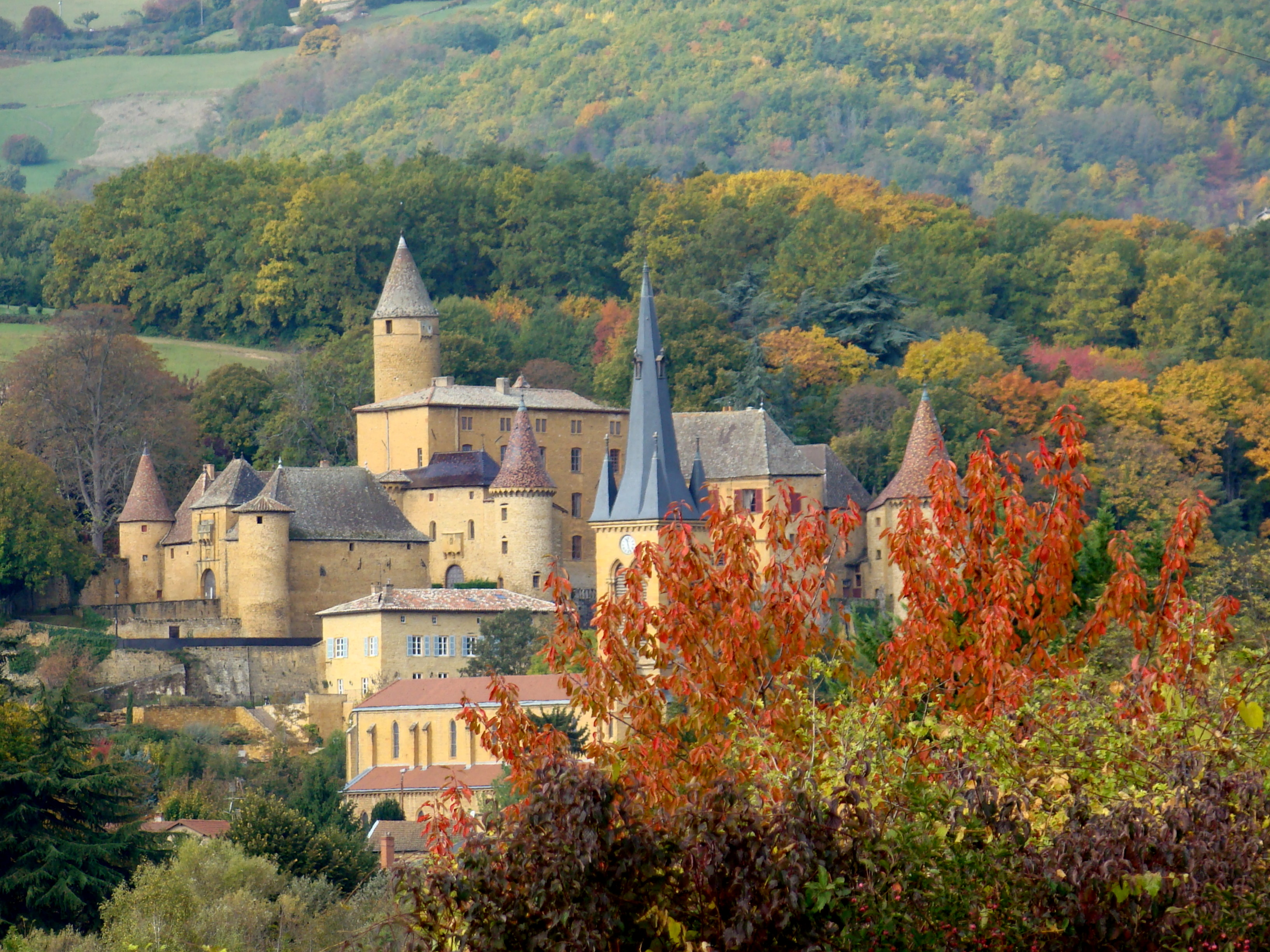
- The chateau and the church in Jarnioux

- Coat of arms
- Location of Jarnioux
- Location within France Location within Auvergne-Rhône-Alpes
- Coordinates: 45°57′56″N 4°37′41″E
- Country: France
- Region: Auvergne-Rhône-Alpes
- Department: Rhône
- Arrondissement: Villefranche-sur-Saône
- Canton: Le Bois-d'Oingt
- Commune: Porte des Pierres Dorées
- Area^{1}: 4.2 km^{2} (1.6 sq mi)
- Elevation: 330 m (1,080 ft)
- Highest elevation: 393 m (1,289 ft)
- Lowest elevation: 259 m (850 ft)
- Population (2022): 713
  - Density: 170/km^{2} (440/sq mi)
- Time zone: UTC+01:00 (CET)
  - Summer (DST): UTC+02:00 (CEST)
- Postal code: 69640
- ^{1} French Land Register data, which excludes lakes, ponds, glaciers > 1 km^{2} (0.386 sq mi or 247 acres) and river estuaries.

Jarnioux (French pronunciation: [ʒaʁnju]) is a former commune in the Rhône department in eastern France. On 1 January 2019, it was merged into the commune Porte des Pierres Dorées.

== Places and monuments ==
Jarnioux has several monuments :

- The manor of the Guard (private, rental of rooms for events).
- The castle of Jarnioux.
- The Sainte Catherine chapel.
- The viaduct of the old Beaujolais railway (Tacot).
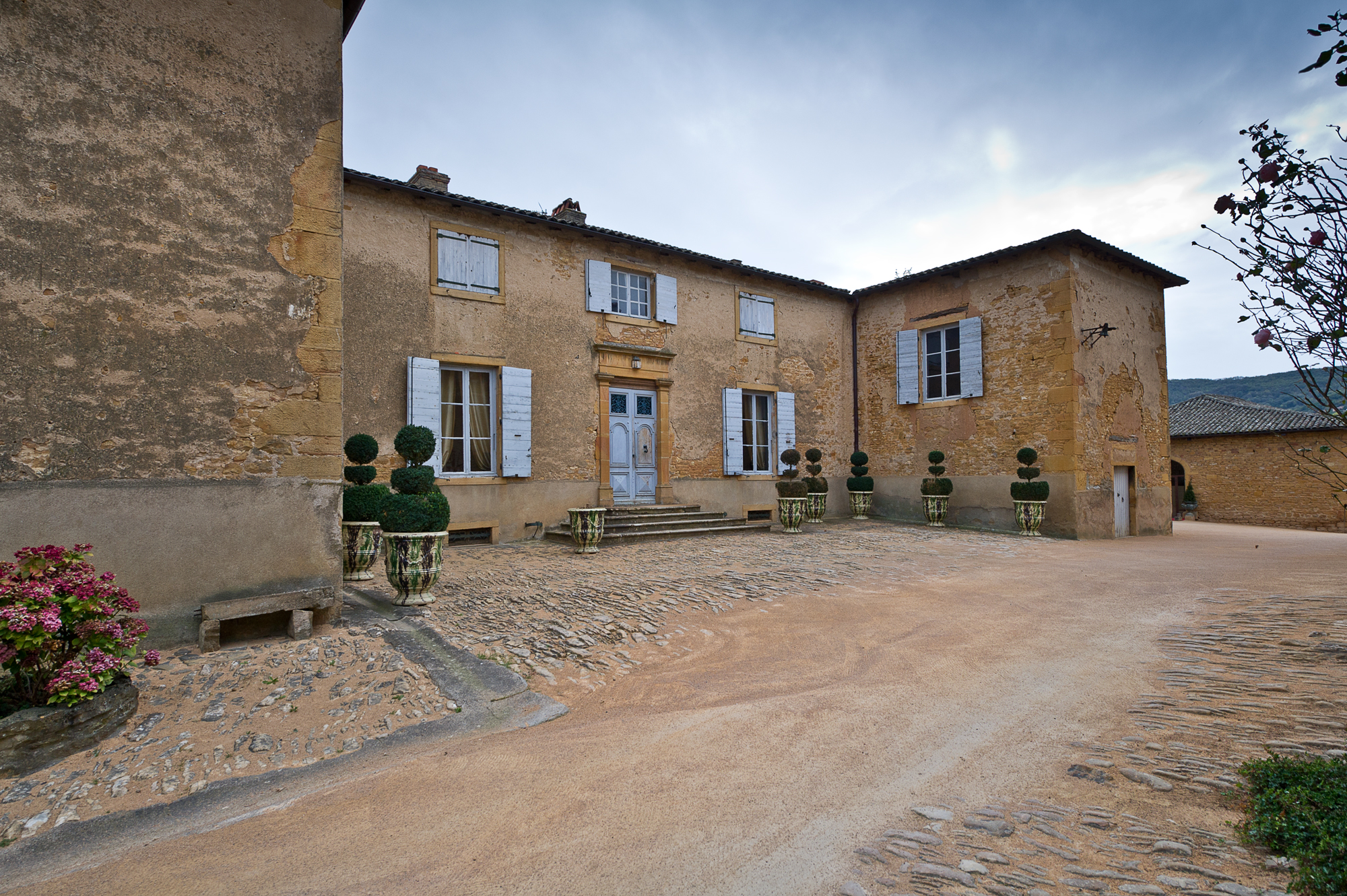
Interior facade of the Manoir de La Garde.

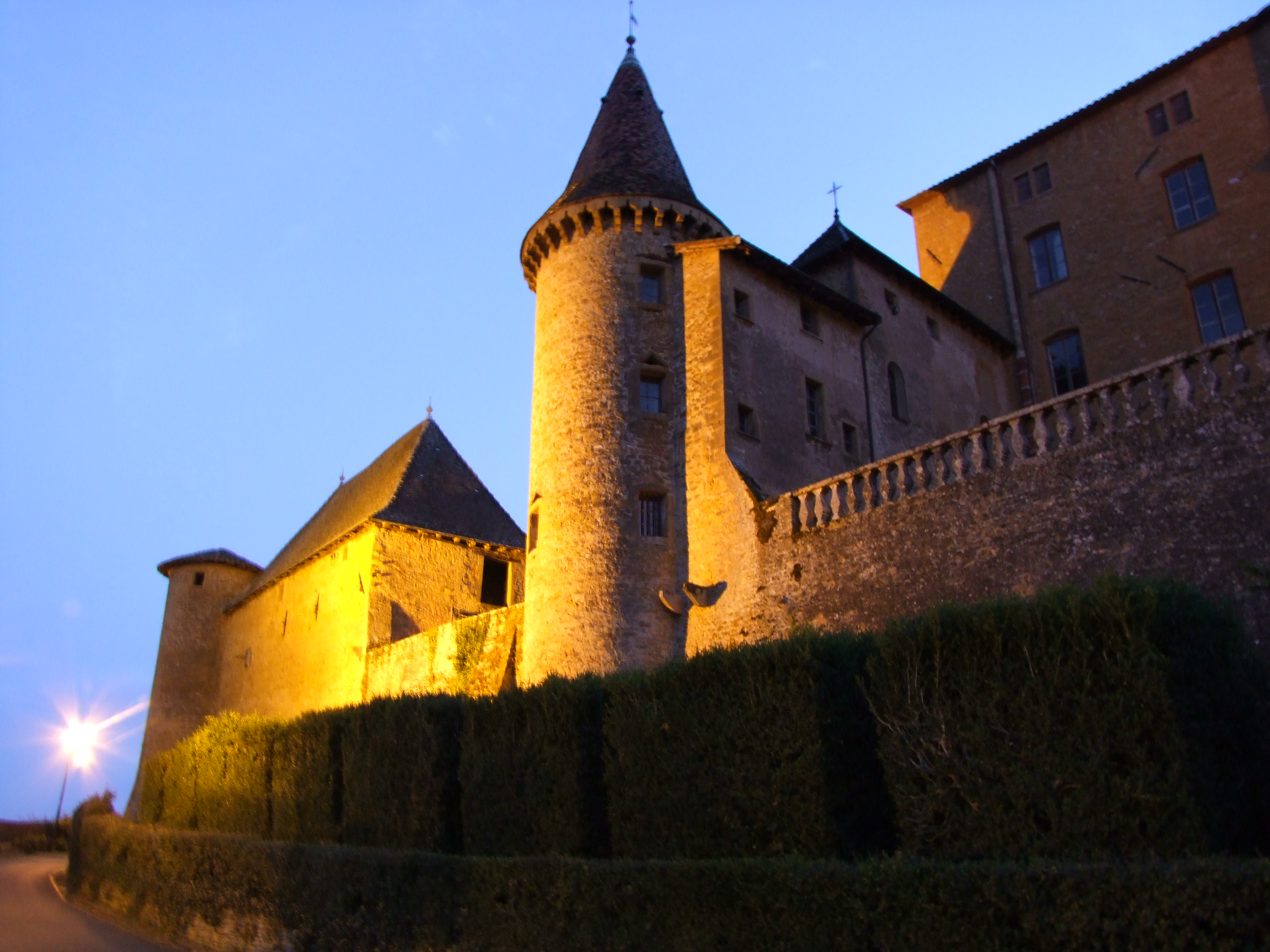
Castle of Jarnioux.

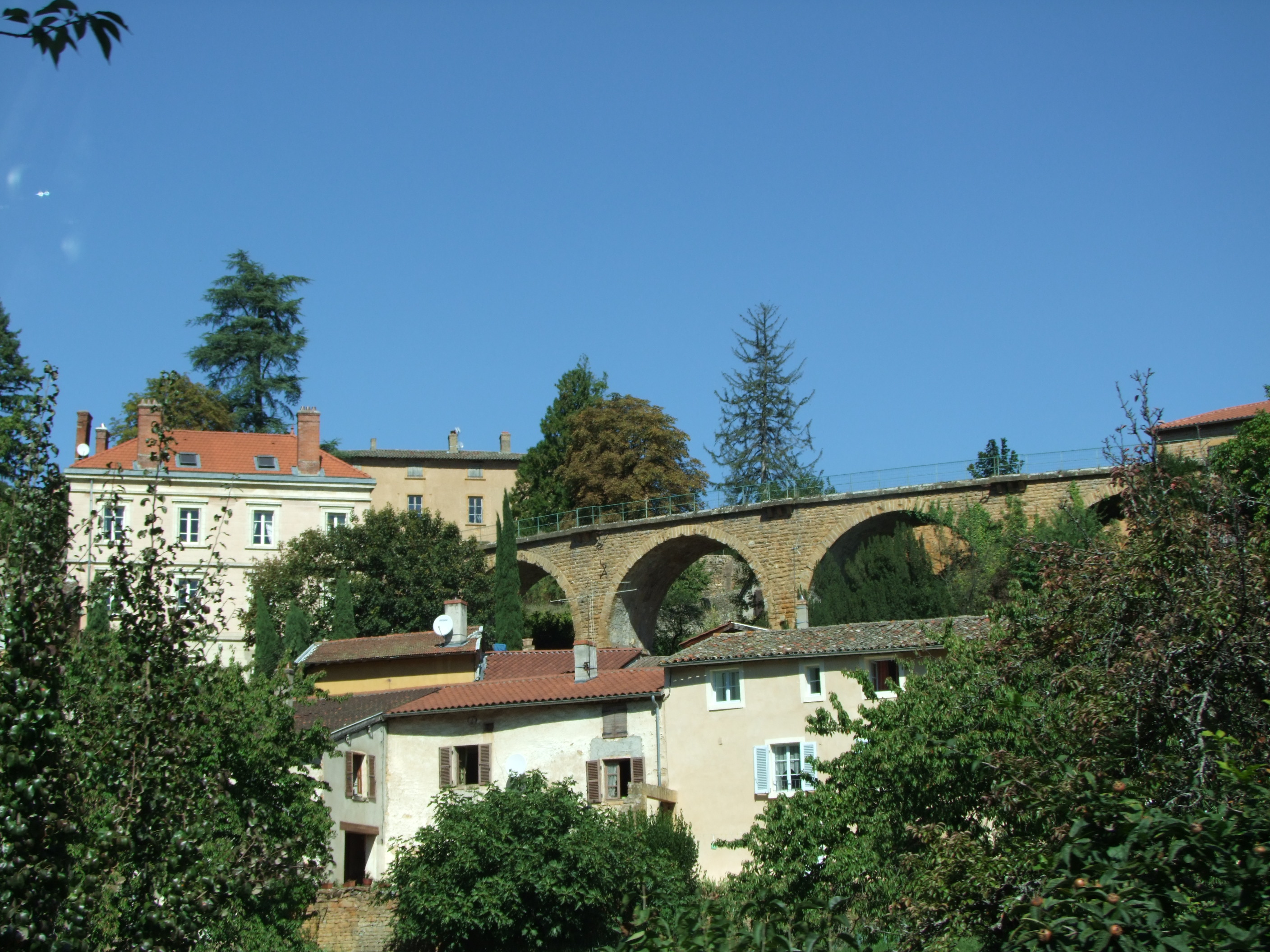
The viaduc of the Tacot.

== Personalities linked to the municipality ==
Auguste Guinon transformed Jarnioux from 1869. He equipped the village with a wash house, a town hall, a school and a church.

Serge Prisset, singer known for the song "Colombe ivre", released in 1970. He lives in Jarnioux.

== See also ==
- Communes of the Rhône department
- Porte des Pierres Dorées
