= Pouilly-le-Monial =

- Part of Porte des Pierres Dorées
- Location of Pouilly-le-Monial
- Location within France Location within Auvergne-Rhône-Alpes
- Coordinates: 45°58′01″N 4°39′00″E
- Country: France
- Region: Auvergne-Rhône-Alpes
- Department: Rhône
- Arrondissement: Villefranche-sur-Saône
- Canton: Le Bois-d'Oingt
- Commune: Porte des Pierres Dorées
- Area^{1}: 3.81 km^{2} (1.47 sq mi)
- Elevation: 290 m (950 ft)
- Highest elevation: 335 m (1,099 ft)
- Lowest elevation: 235 m (771 ft)
- Population (2022): 953
  - Density: 250/km^{2} (648/sq mi)
- Time zone: UTC+01:00 (CET)
  - Summer (DST): UTC+02:00 (CEST)
- Postal code: 69400
- ^{1} French Land Register data, which excludes lakes, ponds, glaciers > 1 km^{2} (0.386 sq mi or 247 acres) and river estuaries.

Pouilly-le-Monial (French pronunciation: [puji lə mɔnjal]) is a former commune in the Rhône department in eastern France. On 1 January 2017, it was merged into the new commune Porte des Pierres Dorées.

== See also ==
- Communes of the Rhône department
- Porte des Pierres Dorées
