= Porte des Pierres Dorées =

- Commune
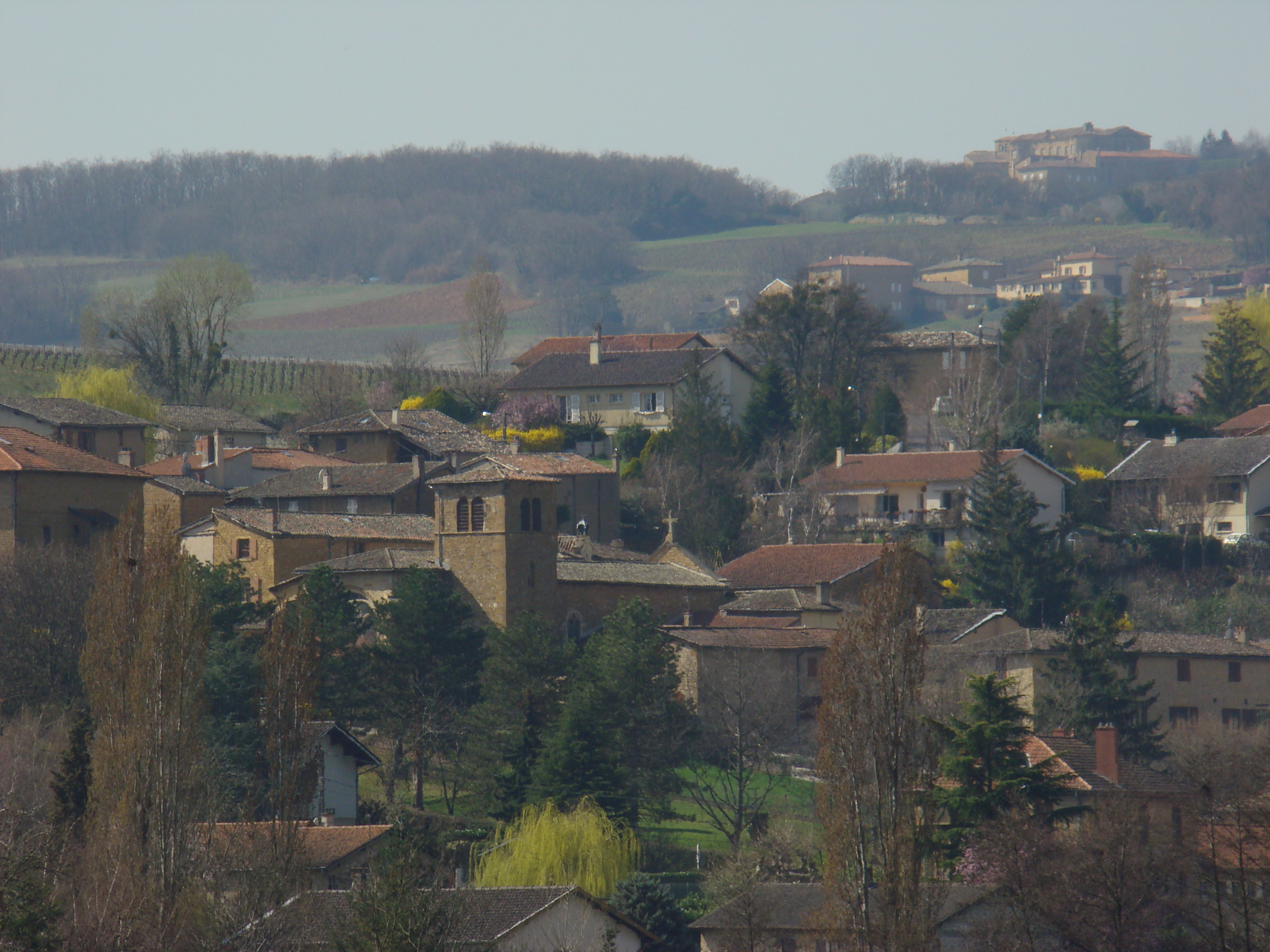
- A general view of Pouilly-le-Monial
- Location of Porte des Pierres Dorées
- Location within France Location within Auvergne-Rhône-Alpes
- Coordinates: 45°57′29″N 4°38′49″E
- Country: France
- Region: Auvergne-Rhône-Alpes
- Department: Rhône
- Arrondissement: Villefranche-sur-Saône
- Canton: Val d'Oingt
- Intercommunality: Beaujolais-Pierres Dorées

Government
  - Mayor (2020–2026): Jean-Paul Gasquet
- Area^{1}: 13.33 km^{2} (5.15 sq mi)
- Population (2023): 4,185
  - Density: 314.0/km^{2} (813.1/sq mi)
- Time zone: UTC+01:00 (CET)
  - Summer (DST): UTC+02:00 (CEST)
- INSEE/Postal code: 69114 /69400
- ^{1} French Land Register data, which excludes lakes, ponds, glaciers > 1 km^{2} (0.386 sq mi or 247 acres) and river estuaries.

Porte des Pierres Dorées (French pronunciation: [pɔʁt de pjɛʁ dɔʁe], literally Gate of the Golden Stones) is a commune in the department of Rhône, eastern France. The municipality was established on 1 January 2017 by merger of the former communes of Pouilly-le-Monial (the seat) and Liergues. On 1 January 2019, the former commune Jarnioux was merged into Porte des Pierres Dorées.

== Population ==
The population data below refer to the commune in its geography as of January 2025.

Historical population
Year	Pop.	±% p.a.
1968	1,694	—
1975	1,776	+0.68%
1982	2,010	+1.78%
1990	2,385	+2.16%
1999	2,650	+1.18%
2007	3,072	+1.86%
2012	3,482	+2.54%
2017	3,753	+1.51%
2023	4,185	+1.83%
Source: INSEE

== Monuments ==
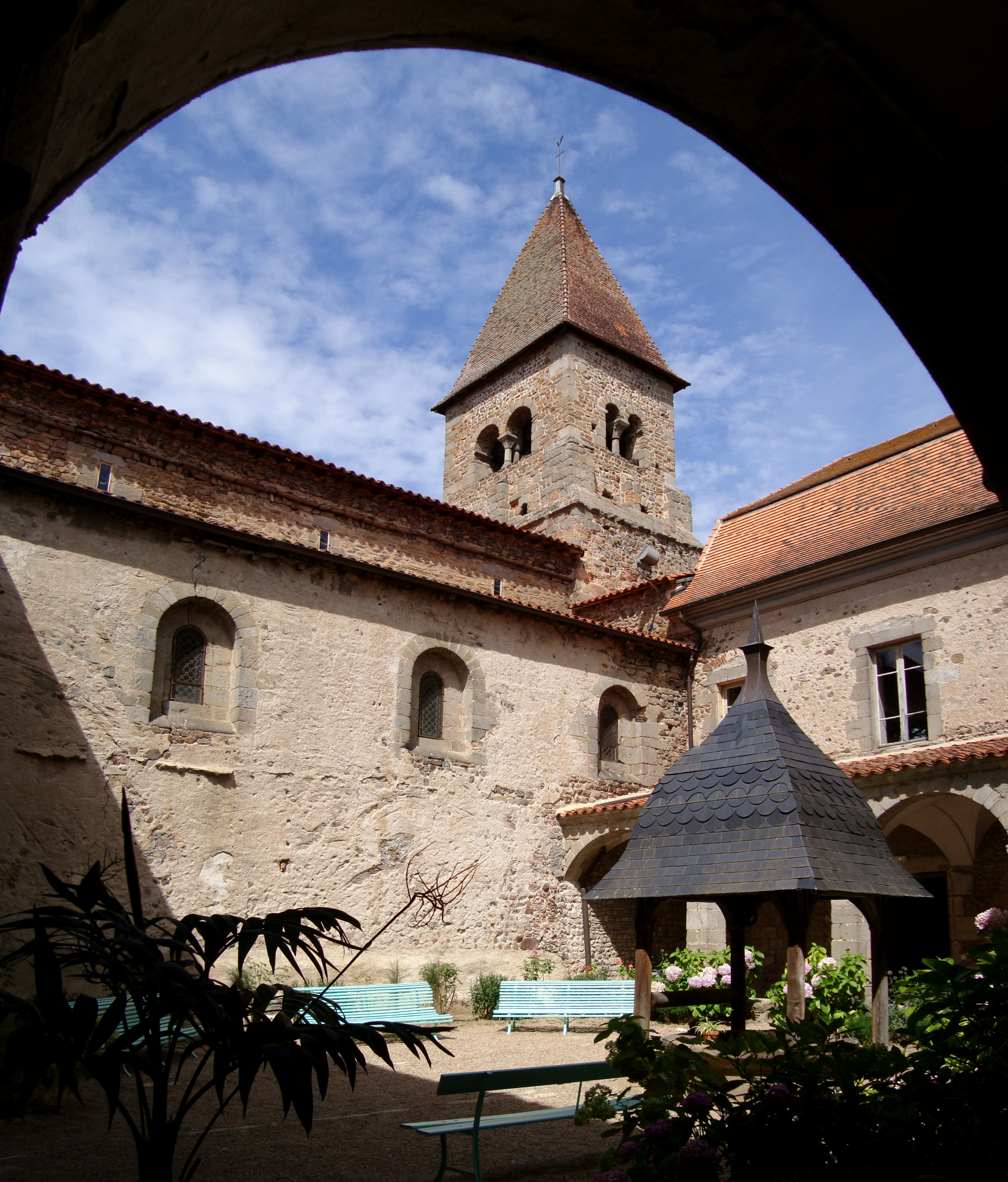
Cloister of Pommiers

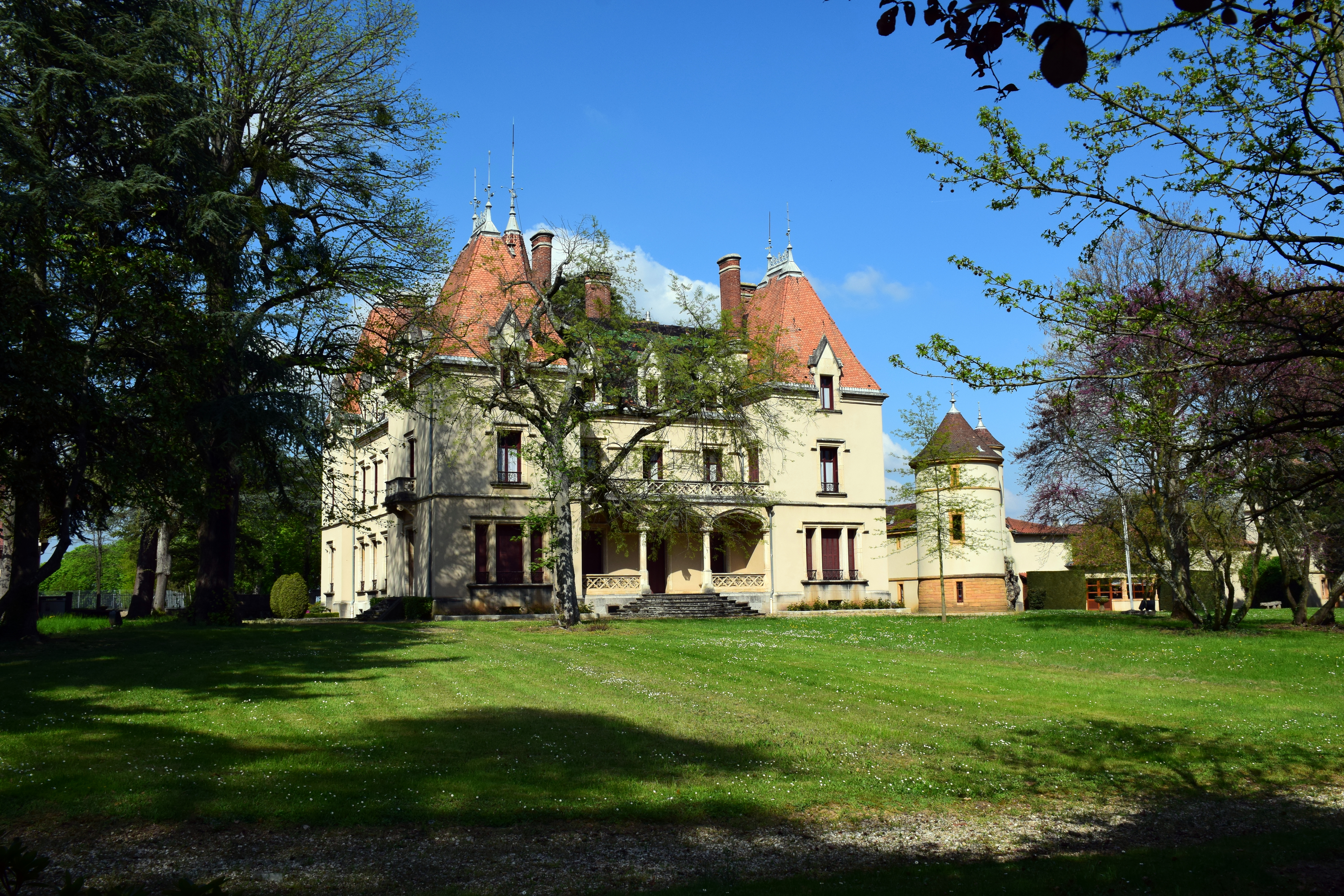
Château de l'Éclair.

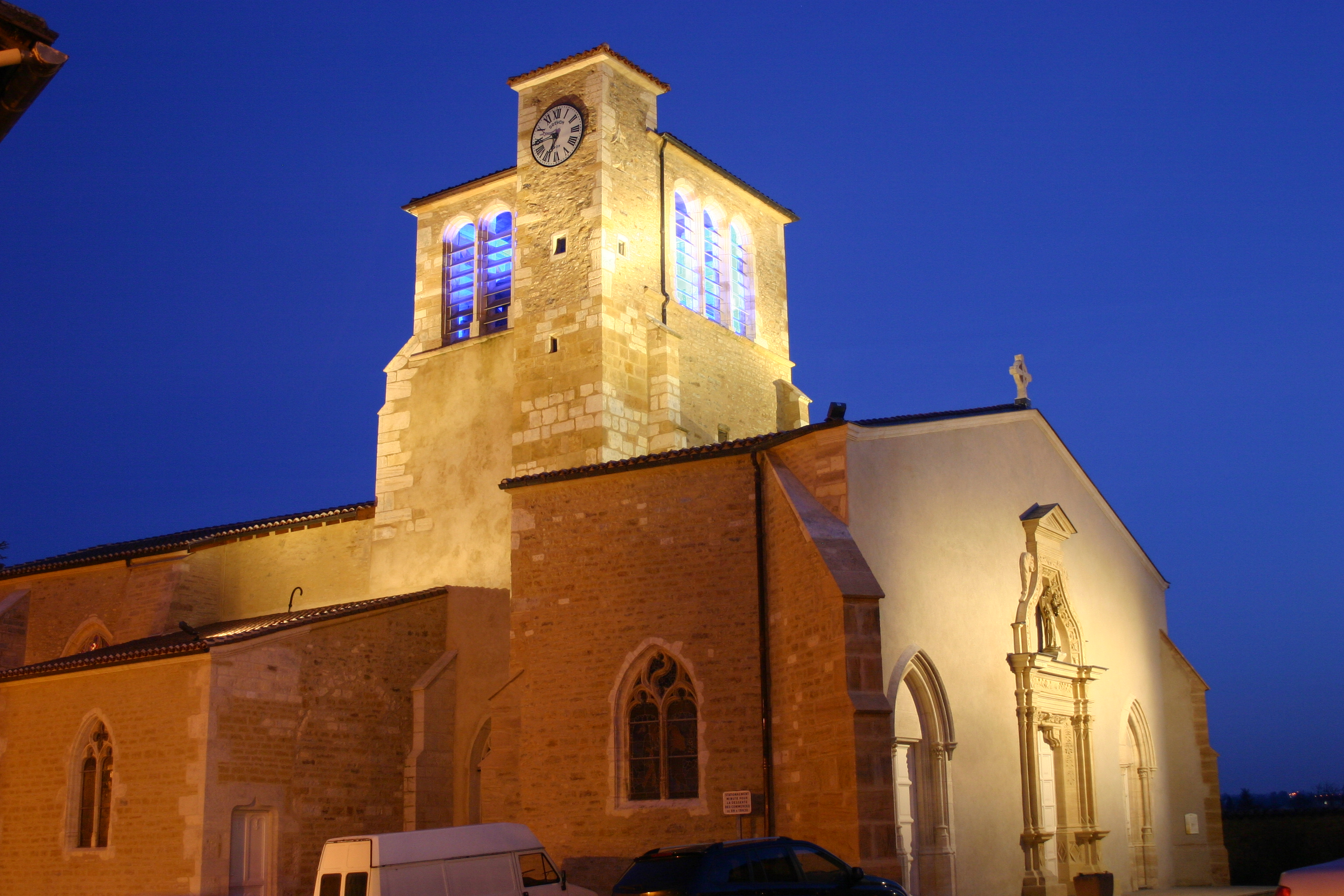
Saint-Éloi church.

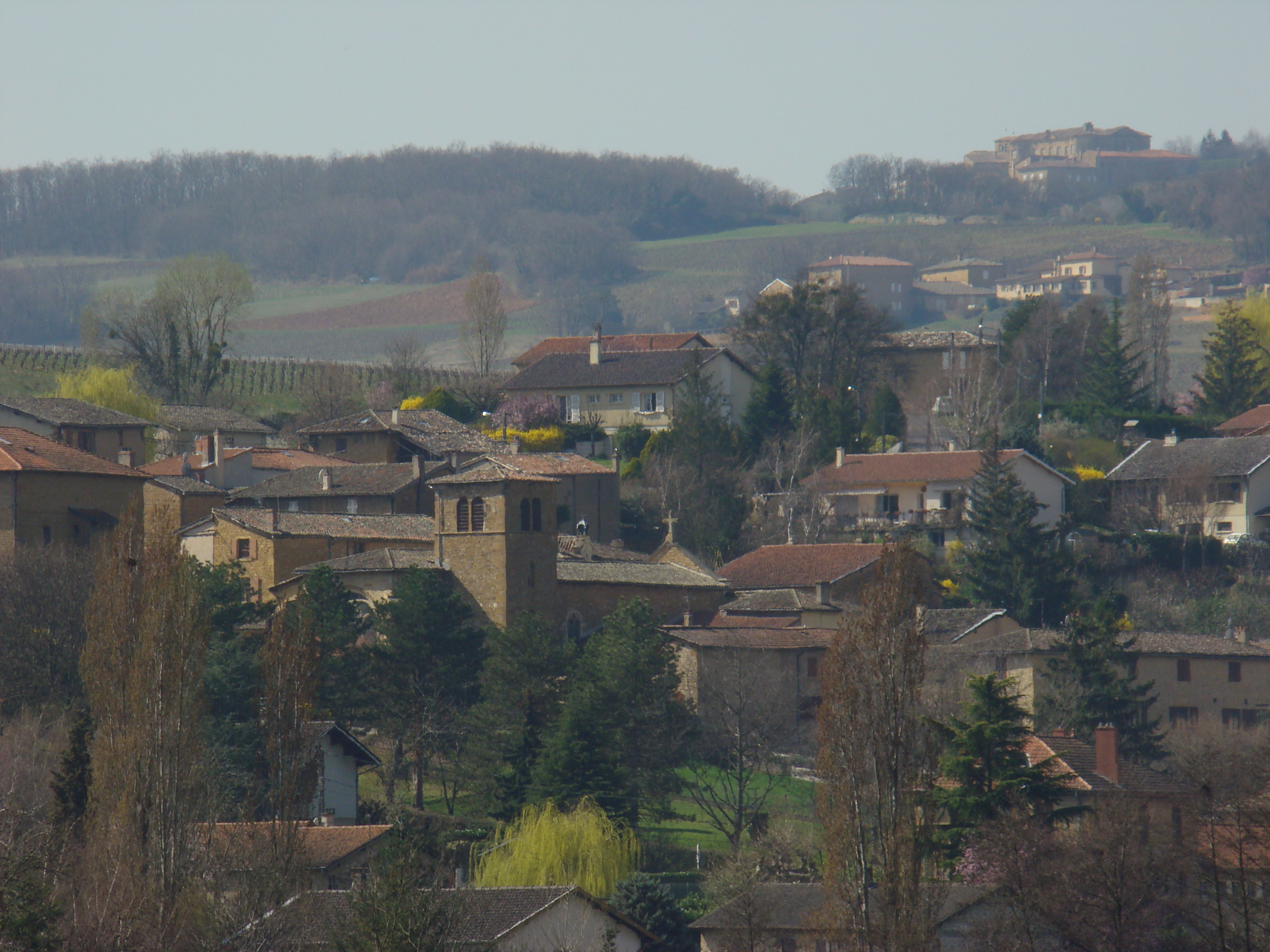
Pouilly le monial

== See also ==
- Communes of the Rhône department
