= Liergues =

- Part of Porte des Pierres Dorées
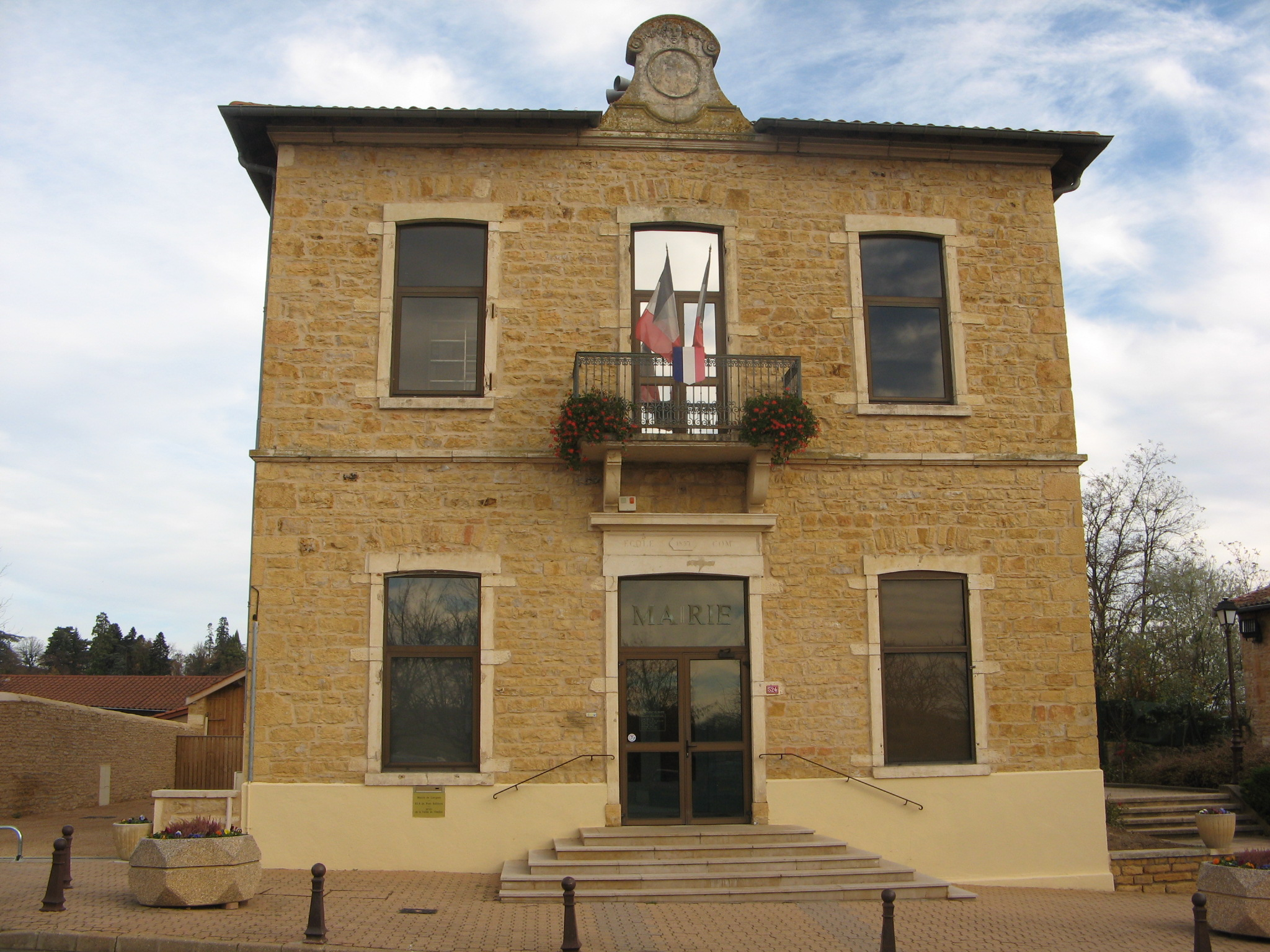
- The town hall in Liergues
- Location of Liergues
- Location within France Location within Auvergne-Rhône-Alpes
- Coordinates: 45°58′01″N 4°40′01″E
- Country: France
- Region: Auvergne-Rhône-Alpes
- Department: Rhône
- Arrondissement: Villefranche-sur-Saône
- Canton: Le Bois-d'Oingt
- Commune: Porte des Pierres Dorées
- Area^{1}: 5.32 km^{2} (2.05 sq mi)
- Elevation: 210 m (690 ft)
- Highest elevation: 308 m (1,010 ft)
- Lowest elevation: 201 m (659 ft)
- Population (2022): 2,413
  - Density: 454/km^{2} (1,170/sq mi)
- Time zone: UTC+01:00 (CET)
  - Summer (DST): UTC+02:00 (CEST)
- Postal code: 69400
- ^{1} French Land Register data, which excludes lakes, ponds, glaciers > 1 km^{2} (0.386 sq mi or 247 acres) and river estuaries.

Liergues (French pronunciation: [ljɛʁɡ]) is a former commune in the Rhône department in eastern France. On 1 January 2017, it was merged into the new commune Porte des Pierres Dorées. Its population was 2,413 in 2022.

== Geography ==
The commune is crossed from south to north by the Merloup (or Merloux) which has its source in Theizé and flows into the Morgon, a tributary of the Saône (and therefore sub-tributary of the Rhône) at Gleizé.

== Places and monuments ==
=== Foundation of the Covenant ===
The Foundation of the Covenant is the junction of monuments establishing a link between Japan Lyon Beaujolais and its surroundings, France through the emblematic figure of Miyamoto Musashi samurai lord belonging to the Japanese Imperial Treasury.

This set includes the Foundation of the Covenant, a Beaujolais stone stele and a flag in Jarnioux (Gate of Golden Stones), the Lyon-Japan Japan-France Heiho Niten Ichi Ryu Memorial and the Bronze Statue of Miyamoto Musashi in Gleizé ( Community of Communes of Villefranche-sur-Saône).

=== Monuments ===
- Saint-Éloi church.
- Château de l'Éclair.
- The cooperative wine cellar of 1929.
- Foundation of the Covenant.
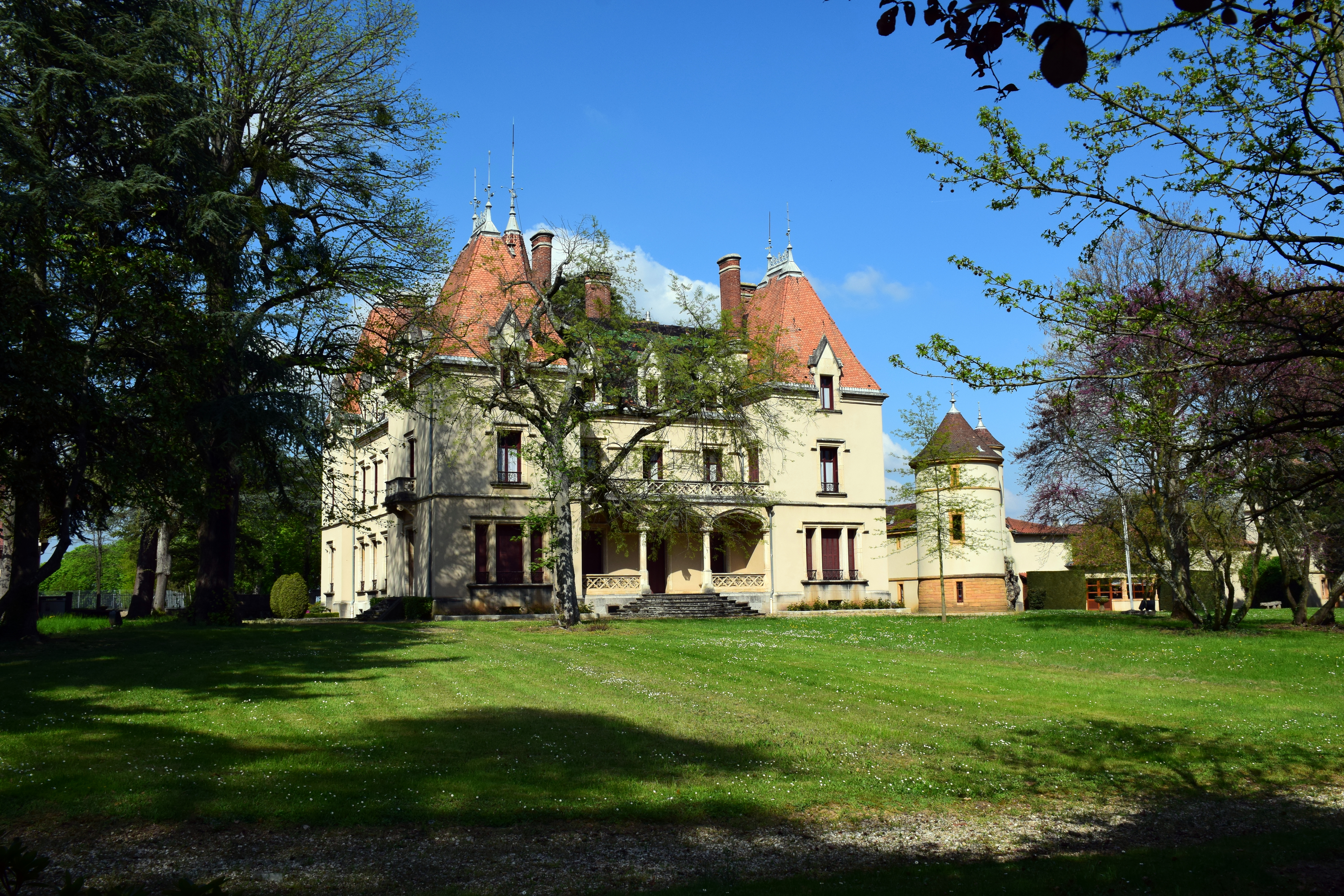
Château de l'Éclair.

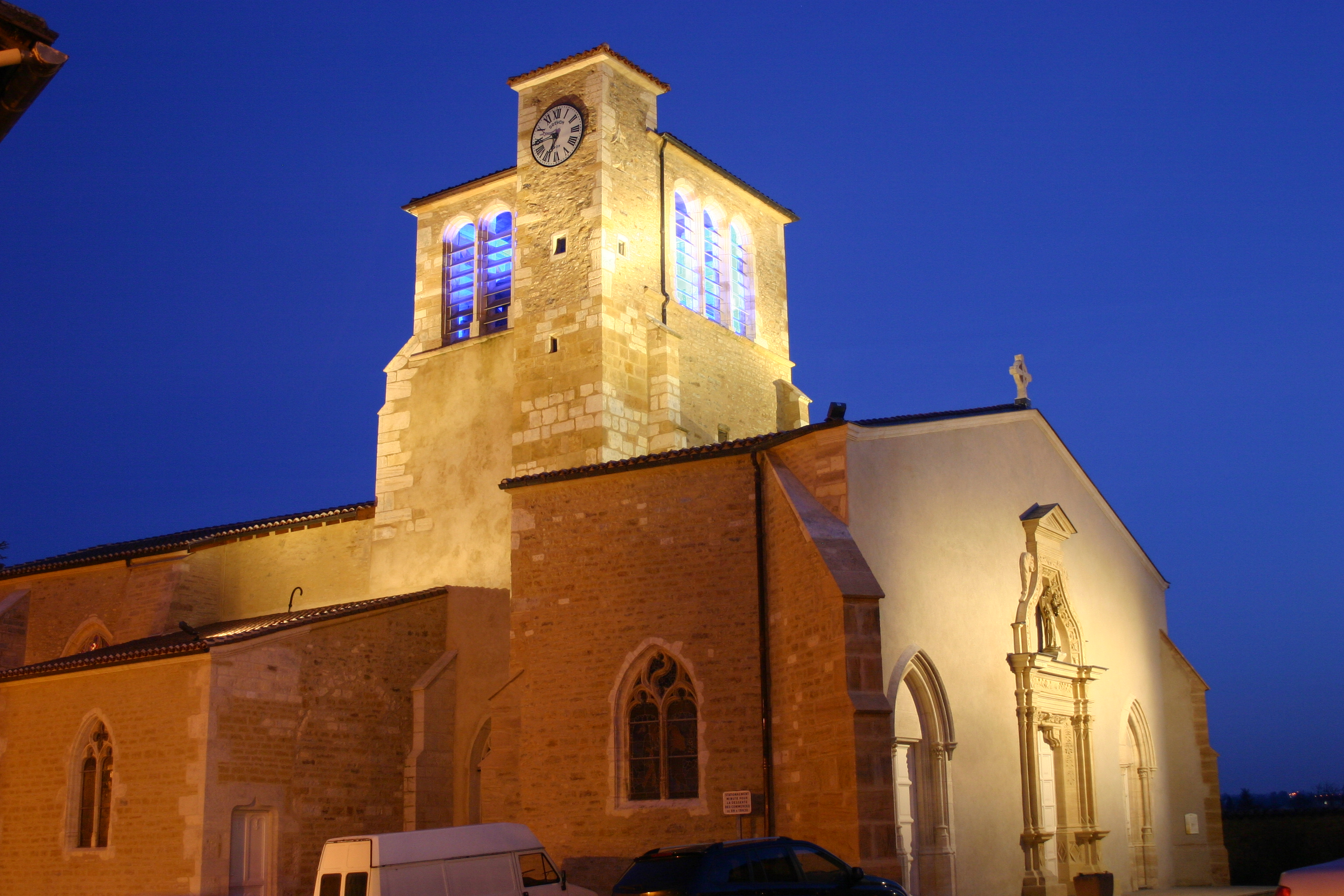
Saint-Éloi church.

== See also ==
- Communes of the Rhône department
- Porte des Pierres Dorées
- Rhône-Alpes
