= JNR Class DD16 =

Class of diesel locomotives operated in Japan

Class DD16
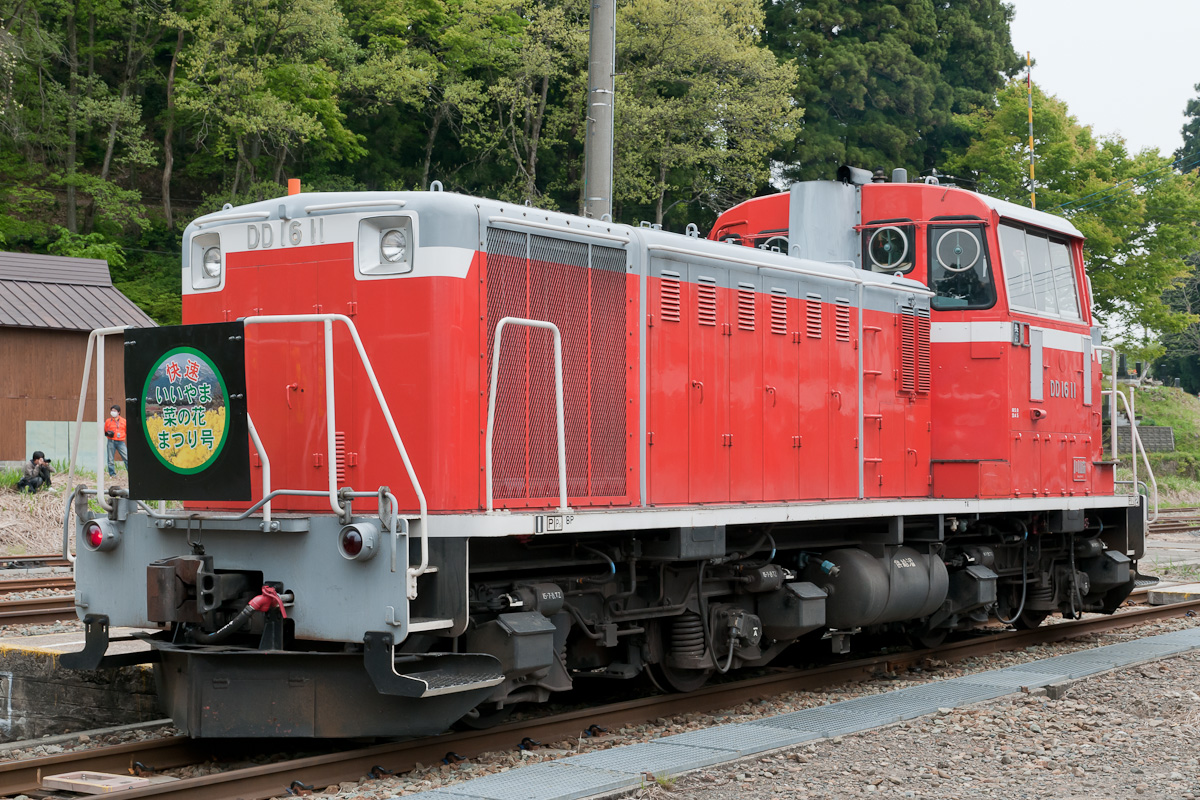
- JR East DD16 11 in service in May 2009
Type and origin
- Power type: Diesel-hydraulic
- Builder: JNR (Nagano), Kawasaki Heavy Industries, Nippon Sharyo
- Build date: 1971–1975
- Total produced: 65
- Rebuild date: 1979-1983
- Number rebuilt: 4
Specifications
- Configuration
  - UIC: Bo’Bo’
  - Commonwealth: Bo-Bo
- Gauge: 1,067 mm (3 ft 6 in)
- Bogies: DT113
- Wheel diameter: 860 mm (2 ft 10 in)
- Length: 11,840 mm (38 ft 10 in)
- Width: 2,805 mm (9 ft 2.4 in)
- Height: 3,925 mm (12 ft 10.5 in)
- Axle load: 12 t
- Loco weight: 48.0 t
- Fuel type: Diesel
- Fuel capacity: 1,550 l
- Engine type: DML61Z
- Transmission: Hydraulic
Performance figures
- Maximum speed: 75 km/h (45 mph)
- Power output: 800 hp (600 kW)
- Tractive effort: 14,400 kgf (141,000 N; 32,000 lbf)
Career
- Operators: ■ JNR (1968-1987); ■ JR West (1987-?); ■ JR Kyushu (1987-?); ■ JR East (1987-); Taiwan High Speed Rail (maintenance)
- Number in class: 1 (as of 1 April 2016)
- Delivered: 1971
- Preserved: 7
- Disposition: In service

The Class DD16 (DD16形) is a four-axle Bo-Bo wheel arrangement diesel-hydraulic locomotive type operated in Japan since 1972. A total of 65 locomotives were built between 1971 and 1975, and as of 1 April 2016, one locomotive remains in service, operated by East Japan Railway Company (JR East).

== Variants ==
A total of 65 locomotives were built between 1971 and 1975.

- Class DD16-0: 65 locomotives built between 1971 and 1975
- Class DD16-300: 4 locomotives converted from DD16-0 locomotives between 1979 and 1983 to become self-propelled snowplough units

== Design ==
The Class DD16 was designed to replace the Class C12 and C56 steam locomotives on non-electrified rural lines where locomotives with a low axle load were required. The design featured an offset centre-cab arrangement using the same DML61Z diesel engine used in the Class DD51 locomotives, derated from 1,000 hp (750 kW) to 800 hp (600 kW).

== History ==
The first two locomotives, DD16 1 and 2, were built at the Japanese National Railways (JNR) Nagano factory, and these were tested on the Koumi Line and Iida Line.

Between 1979 and 1983, four locomotives (DD16 2, 5, 4, and 13) were converted at JNR's Nagano and Matto workshops to become self-propelled snowplough units, numbered DD16 301 to 304, with the addition of bogie snowplough units on either end.

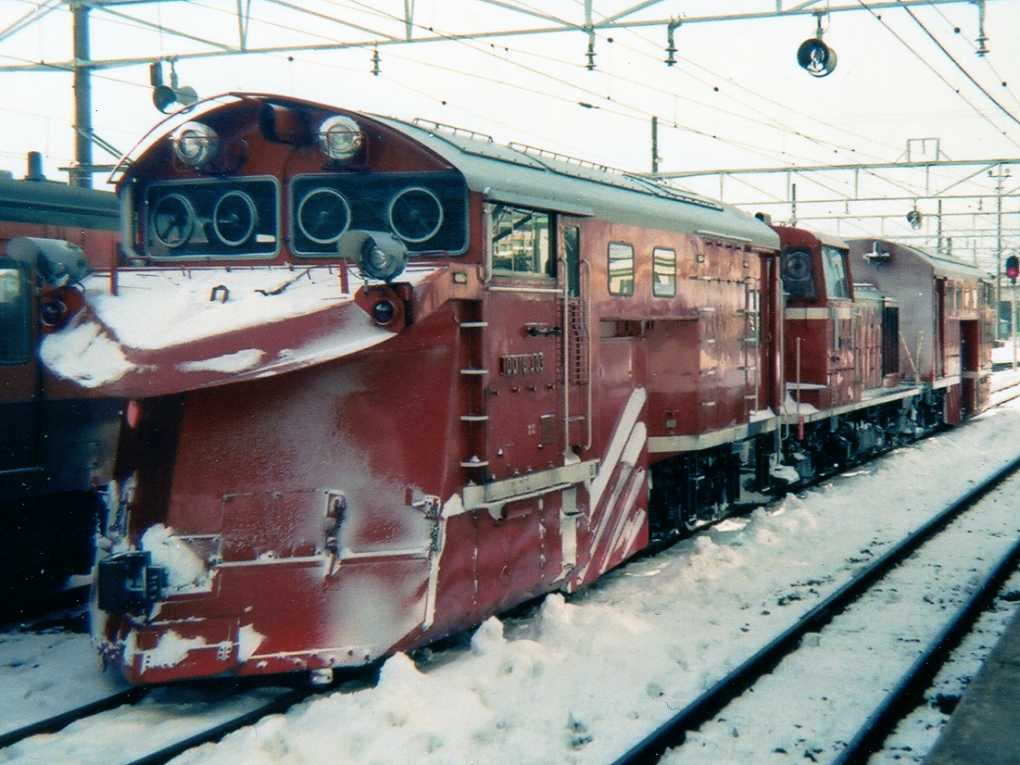
Snowplough unit DD16 303 in service on the Oito Line in February 1991

With the closure of many rural lines and discontinuation of rural freight services in the 1980s, many of the class were withdrawn from operation and scrapped.

With the privatization of JNR in April 1987, just ten Class DD16 locomotives remained in service, transferred to operation by JR Group operating companies.

By 1 April 1995, seven locomotives were still in service, with four (DD16-0 and DD16-300) operated by East Japan Railway Company (JR East), two (DD16-0) operated by Kyushu Railway Company (JR Kyushu), and one (DD16-300) operated by West Japan Railway Company (JR West).

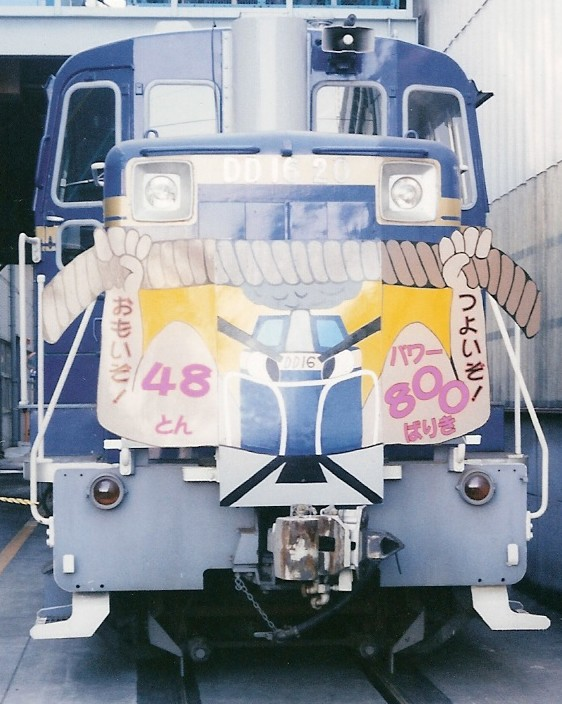
JR East DD16 20 in October 1999 at Omiya Works, where it was used as a works shunter, repainted in "Hokutosei" blue livery

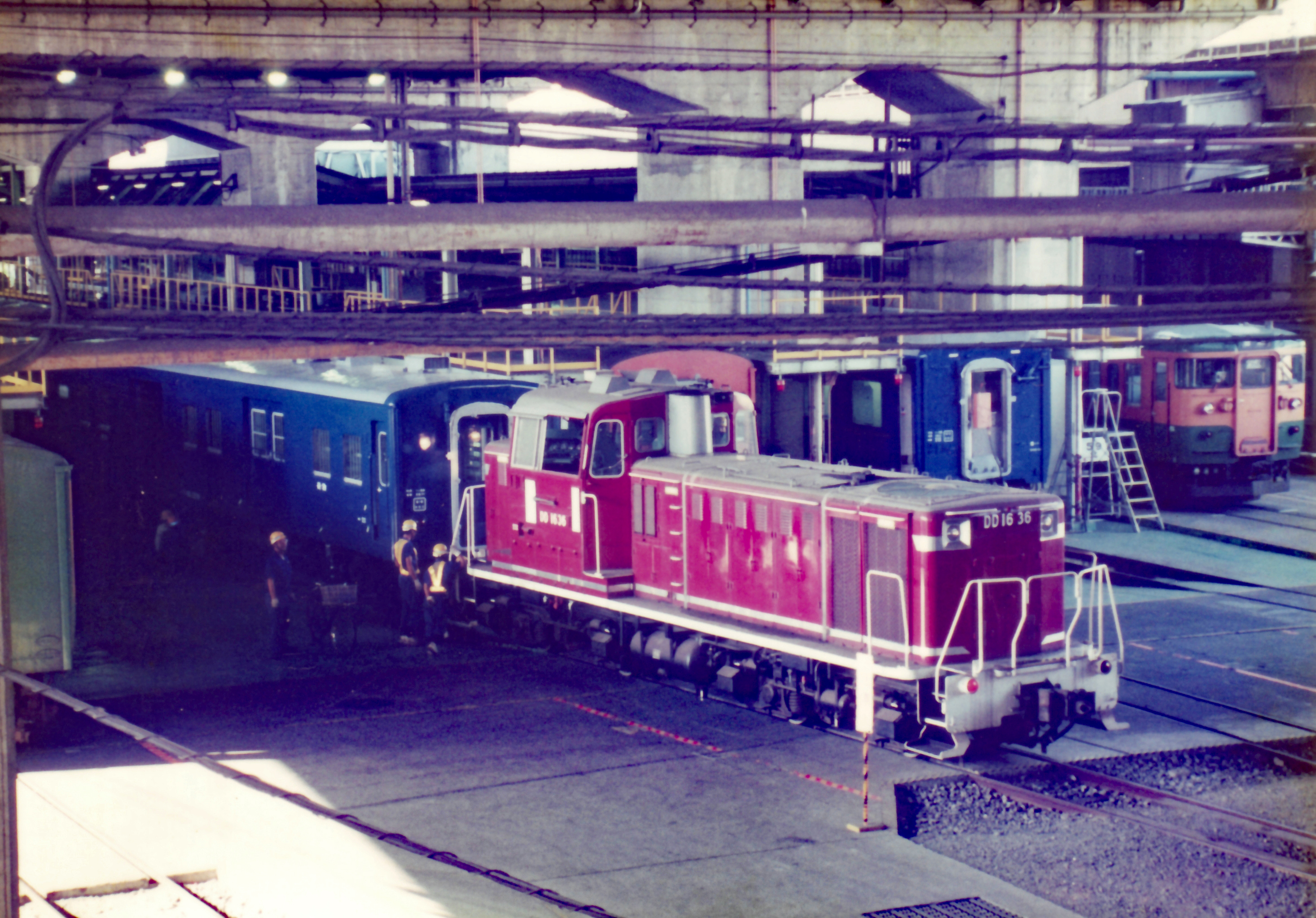
JR East DD16 36 in August 1994 at Omiya Works, where it was used as a works shunter, repainted in "Hokutosei" maroon livery

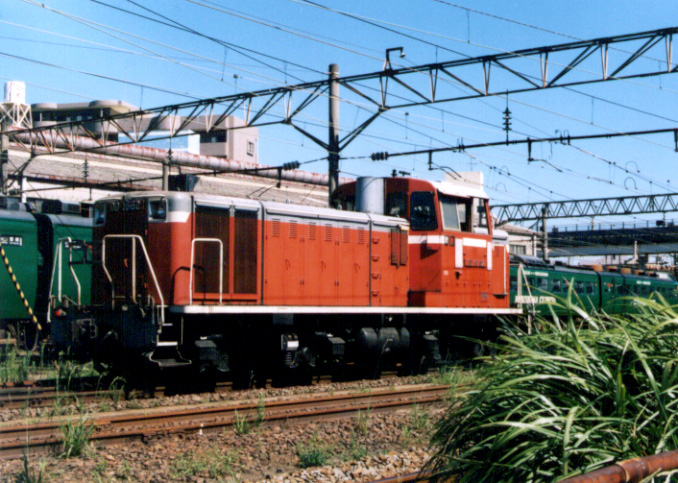
JR Kyushu DD16 62 at Kagoshima Depot in August 1998

As of 1 April 2016, one locomotive, DD16 11, remains in service, operated by JR East.

== Preserved examples ==
As of 2014, seven Class DD16 locomotives are preserved.

- DD16 1: Preserved at Nagano General Rolling Stock Center in Nagano
- DD16 7: Preserved in operational condition at Wakasa Station on the Wakasa Railway
- DD16 15: Preserved at the Mikasa Railway Parek in Mikasa, Hokkaido
- DD16 17: Preserved at the Otaru Museum in Otaru, Hokkaido
- DD16 31: Preserved inside the "Memorial Ship Hakkoda" in Aomori
- DD16 64: Preserved in Nōgata, Fukuoka
- DD16 303: Preserved in Nagano
- DD16 304: Preserved at the Tsuyama Railroad Educational Museum in Tsuyama, Okayama.
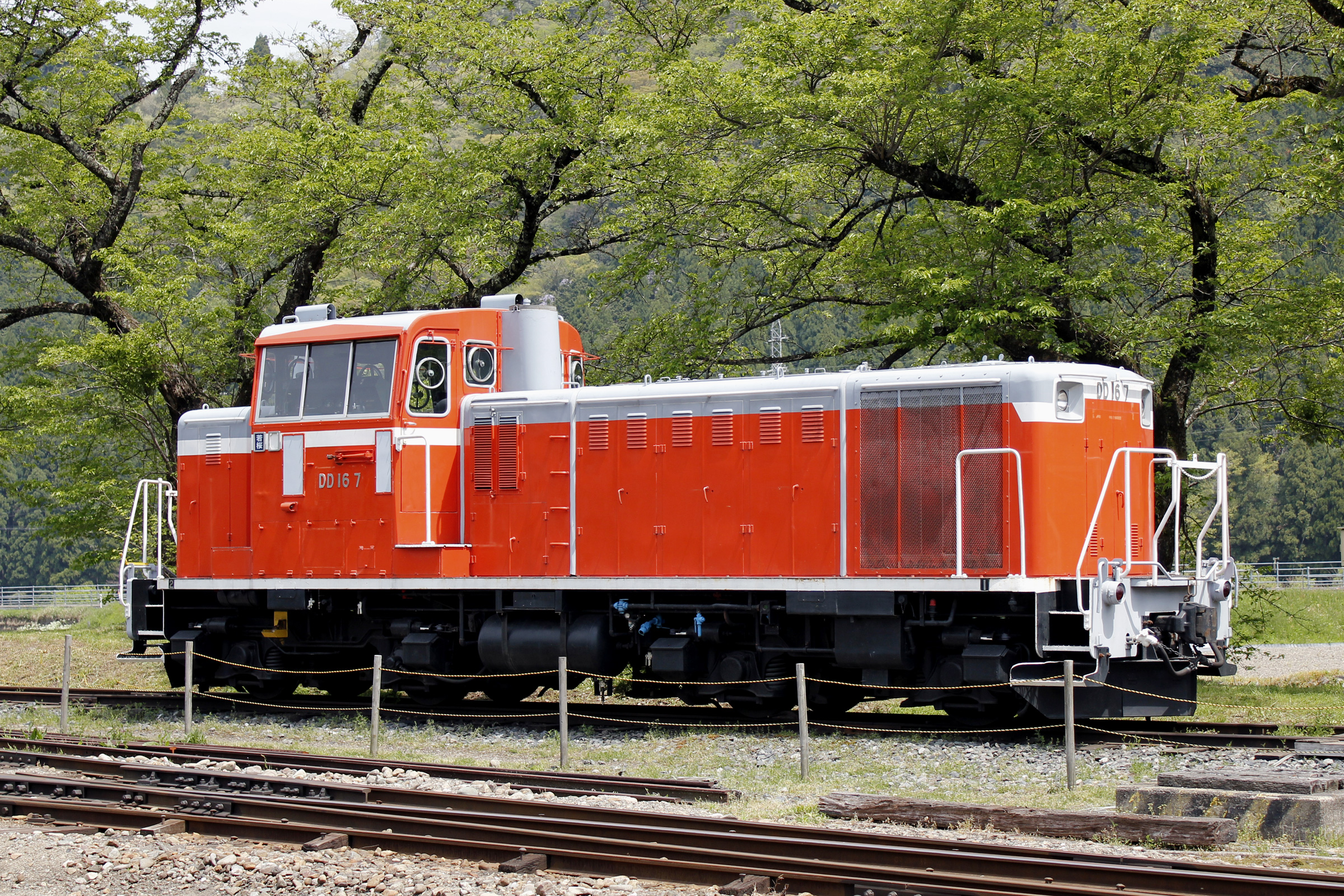
DD16 7 on the Wakasa Railway

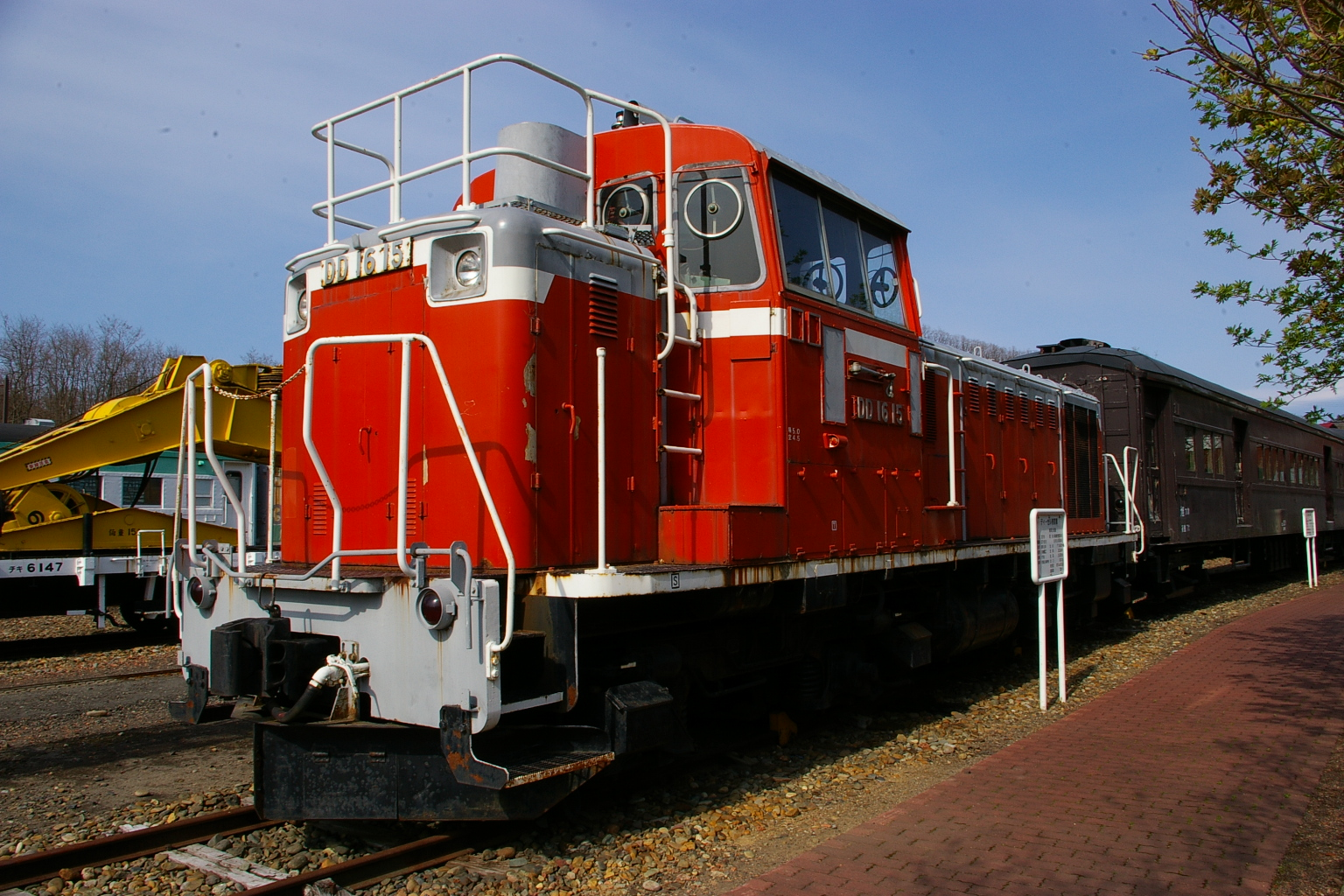
DD16 15 at the Mikasa Railway Park in May 2007

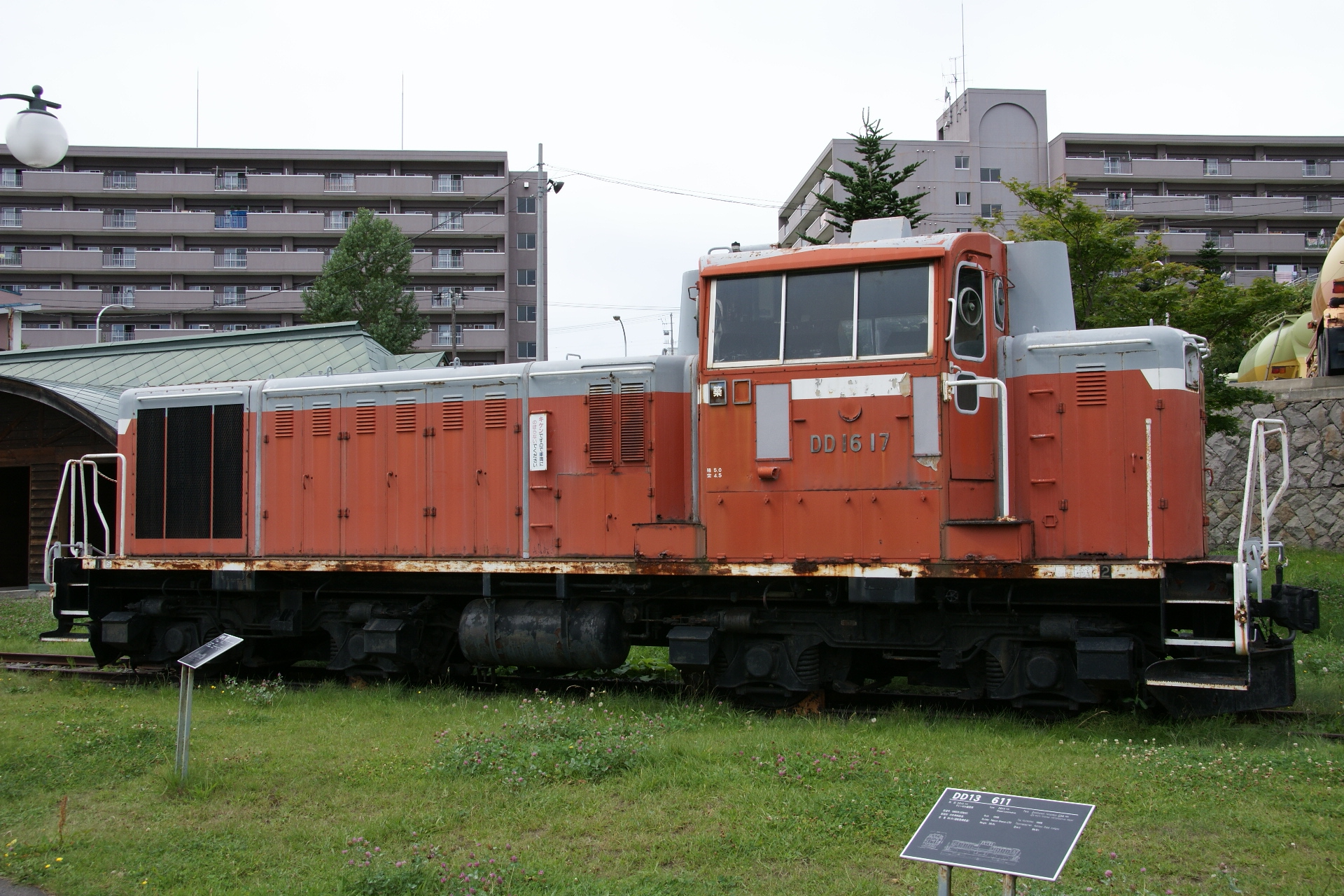
DD16 17 at the Otaru Museum in August 2009

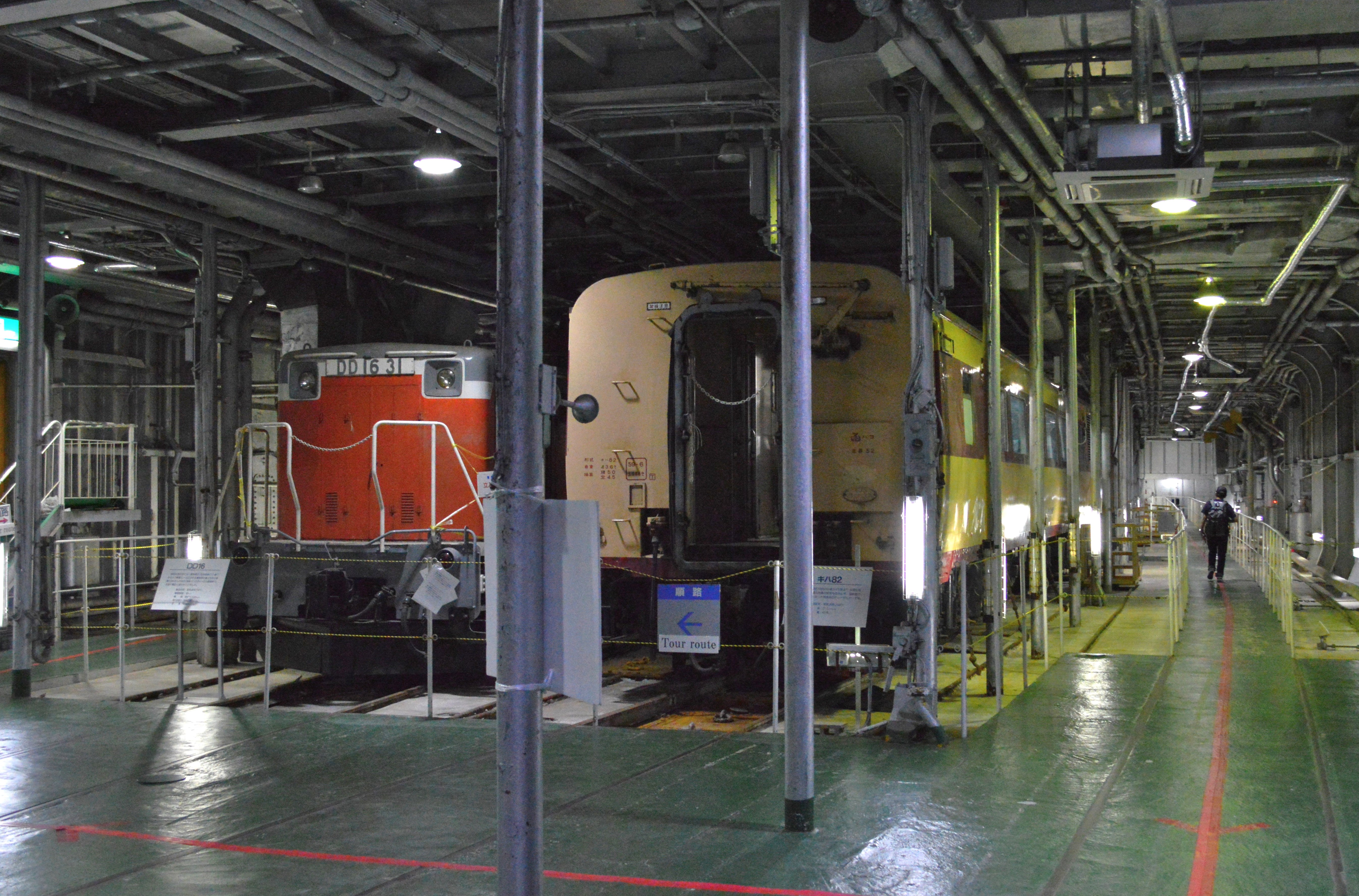
DD16 31 inside the "Memorial Ship Hakkoda" in Aomori in September 2014

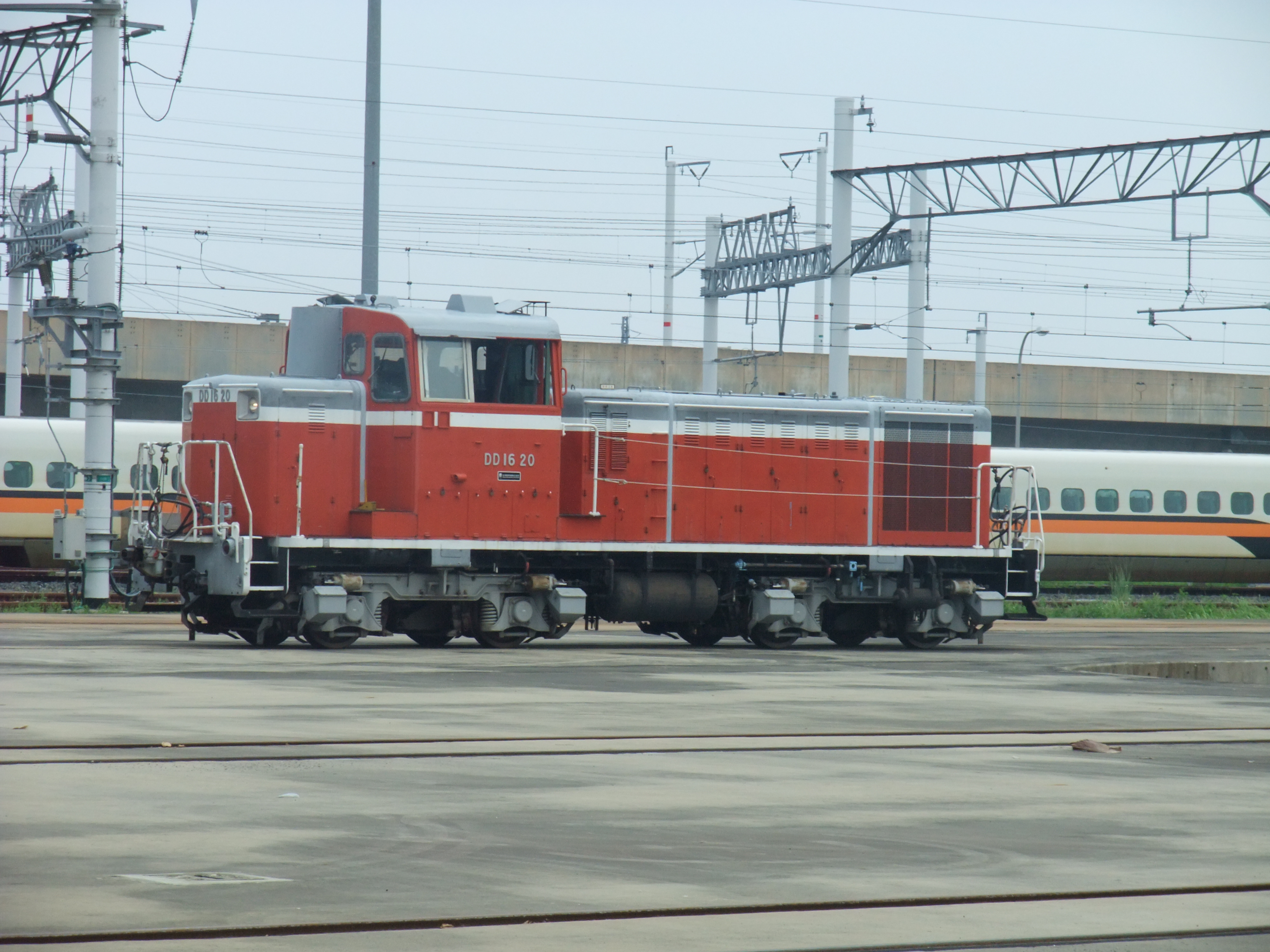
DD16 20 in Taiwan in August 2009, where it was used on the Taiwan High Speed Line

== Classification ==
The DD16 classification for this locomotive type is explained below.

- D: Diesel locomotive
- D: Four driving axles
- 16: Locomotive with maximum speed of 85 km/h or less
