= JNR Class DF50 =

Japanese diesel locomotive type

Class DF50
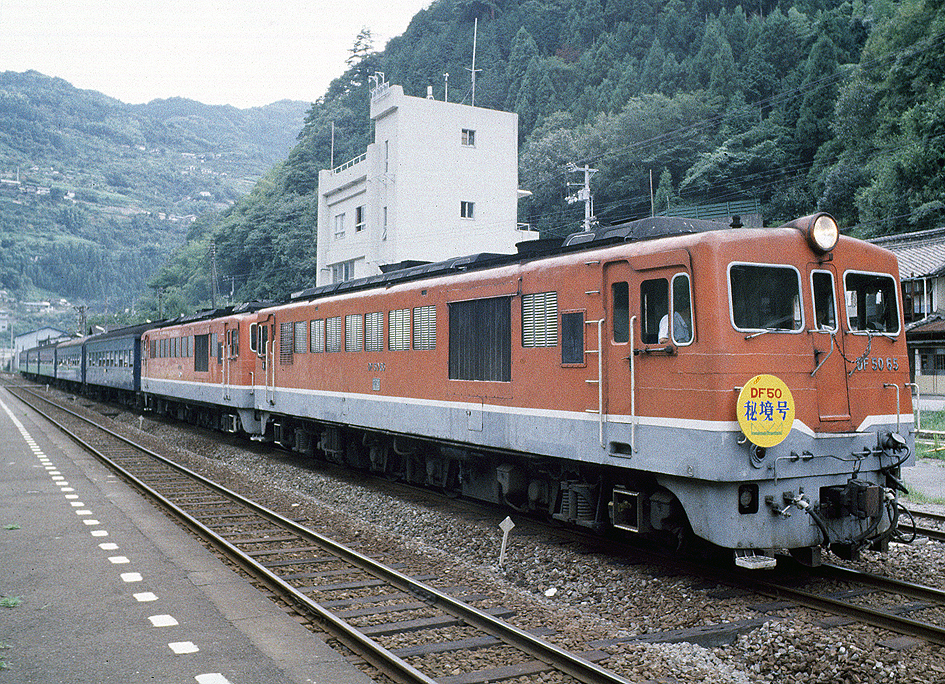
- A pair of DF50s on a farewell tour in 1983
Type and origin
- Power type: Diesel–electric
- Builder: Hitachi; Kawasaki; Kisha Seizō; Mitsubishi; Nippon Sharyō; Toshiba
- Build date: 1957–1963
- Total produced: 138
Specifications
- Configuration
  - UIC: Bo'Bo'Bo'
  - Commonwealth: Bo-Bo-Bo
- Gauge: 1,067 mm (3 ft 6 in)
- Wheel diameter: 800 mm (2 ft 7 in)
- Length: 16,400 mm (53 ft 10 in)
- Width: 2,932 mm (9 ft 7.4 in)
- Height: 3,987 mm (13 ft 1.0 in)
- Loco weight: 85.1 t
- Traction motors: MT48 x 6
Performance figures
- Maximum speed: 90 km/h (55 mph)
- Power output: 1,060 hp (DF50-0), 1,200 hp (DF50-500)
Career
- First run: 1957
- Last run: 1983
- Preserved: 3

The Class DF50 (DF50形) is a class of Bo-Bo-Bo wheel arrangement diesel–electric locomotives operated by Japanese National Railways (JNR) in Japan from 1957 until 1983.

== Variants ==
=== DF50-0 ===
The first batch of 65 locomotives was built between 1957 and 1962 with Sulzer 8-cylinder 8LDA25A 1,060 hp diesel engines. Production was shared between Kisha Seizō, Mitsubishi, and Nippon Sharyō.

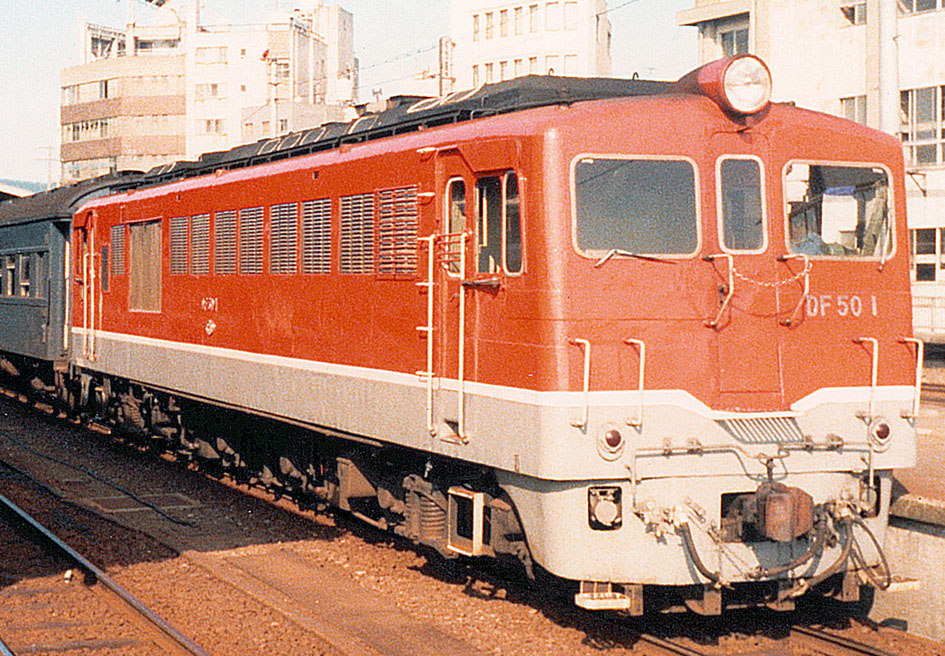
DF50 1 on a passenger service in 1979

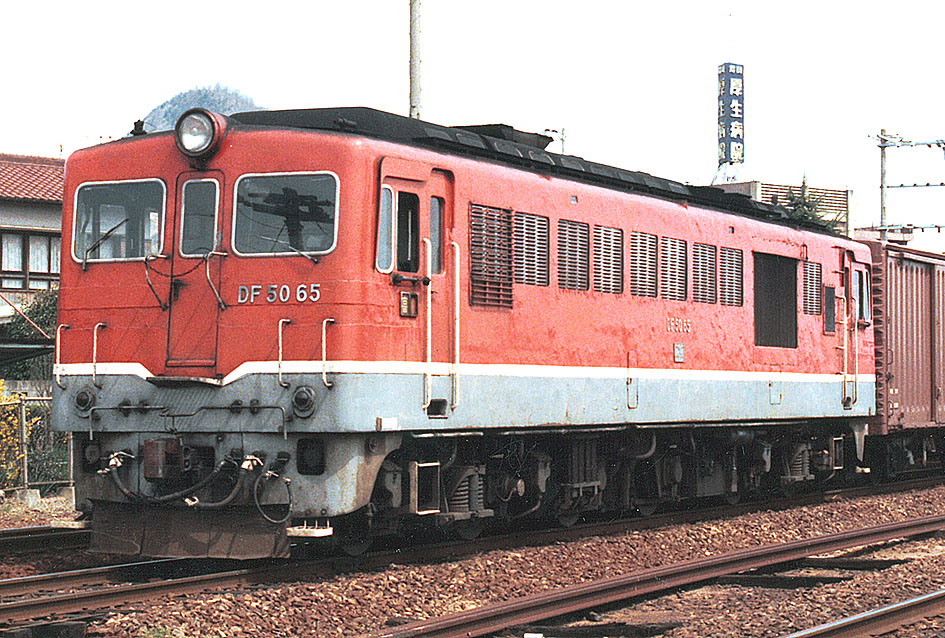
DF50 65 on a freight working in 1982

=== DF50-500 ===
A later batch of 73 locomotives was built between 1958 and 1963 with MAN V6 V22/30 1,200 hp diesel engines. Production was shared between Hitachi, Kawasaki, and Toshiba.

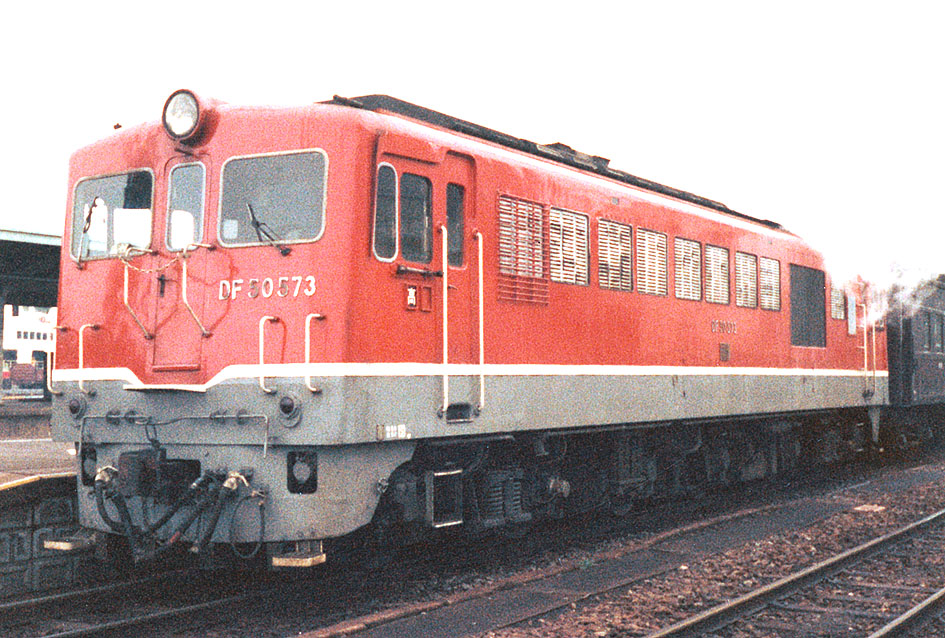
DF50 573 on a passenger service in Shikoku in 1979

== Operations ==
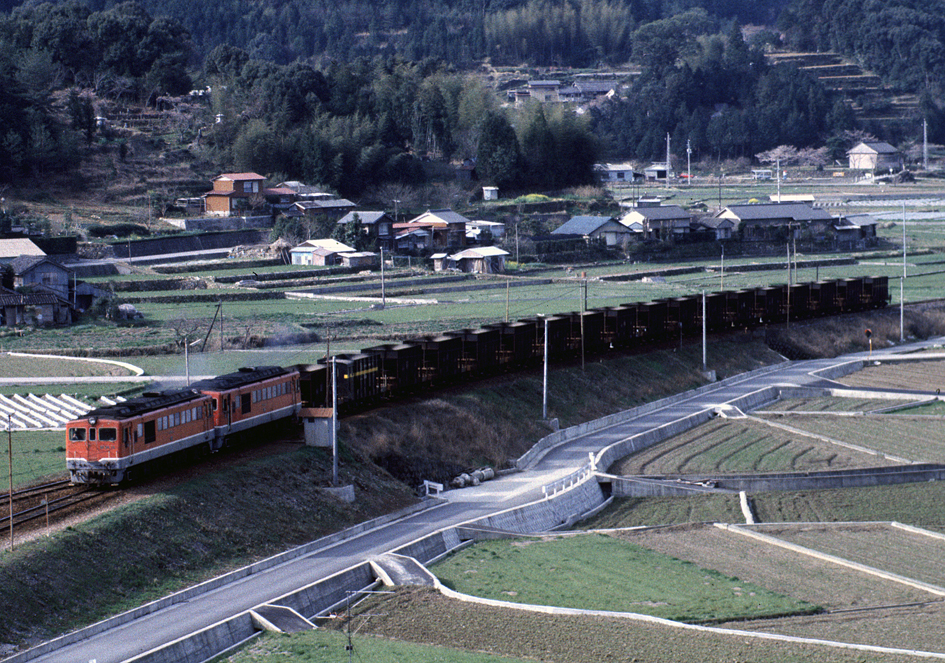
A pair of Class DF50s on a limestone freight working in 1983

Class DF50 locomotives were intended for use on both passenger and freight services, and included a steam generator for train heating. They operated on the following lines, including use hauling "Blue Train" sleeping car services.

- Hokuriku Main Line
- Sanin Main Line
- Dosan Line (Shikoku)
- Kisei Line
- Nippo Line (Kyushu)

In later years, operations were restricted to Kyushu and Shikoku, with the remaining locomotives withdrawn in 1983, except for DF50 1, which later passed into JR Shikoku ownership.

== Livery ==
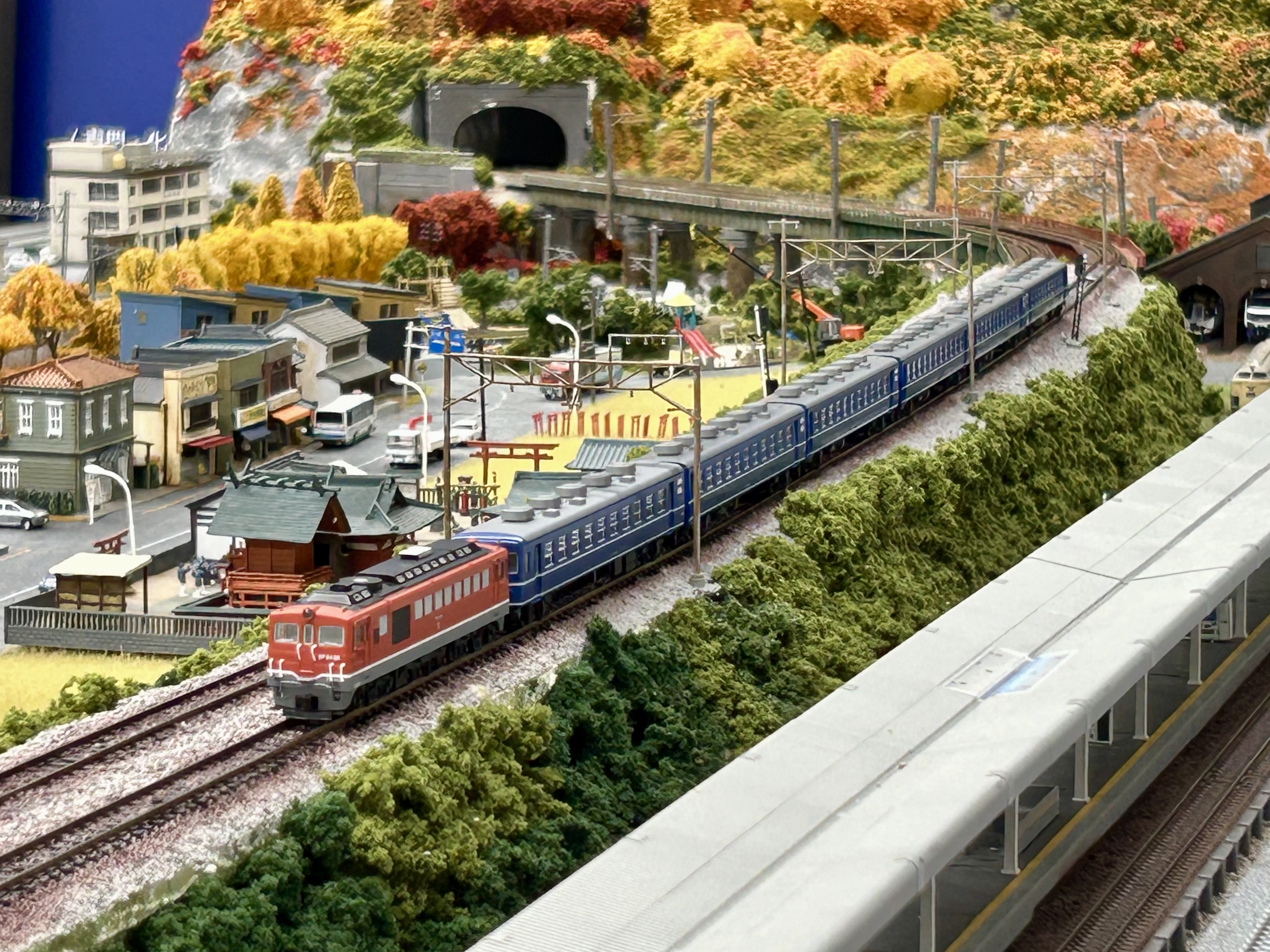
An N scale model of a JNR Class DF50 diesel locomotive with 12 series passenger cars manufactured by KATO, showing the livery of the locomotive before its withdrawal from service.

The locomotives were initially painted in all-over maroon with stainless steel bands, but were subsequently repainted into the standard JNR diesel locomotive livery of vermillion and grey.

== Preserved examples ==
Three Class DF50 locomotives were preserved.

- DF50 1: Preserved at The Railway History Park in Saijo, Ehime
- DF50 4: Preserved in a park in Osaka
- DF50 18: Formerly preserved at the Modern Transportation Museum, Osaka, but moved to the Tsuyama Railroad Educational Museum in Tsuyama, Okayama in March 2015
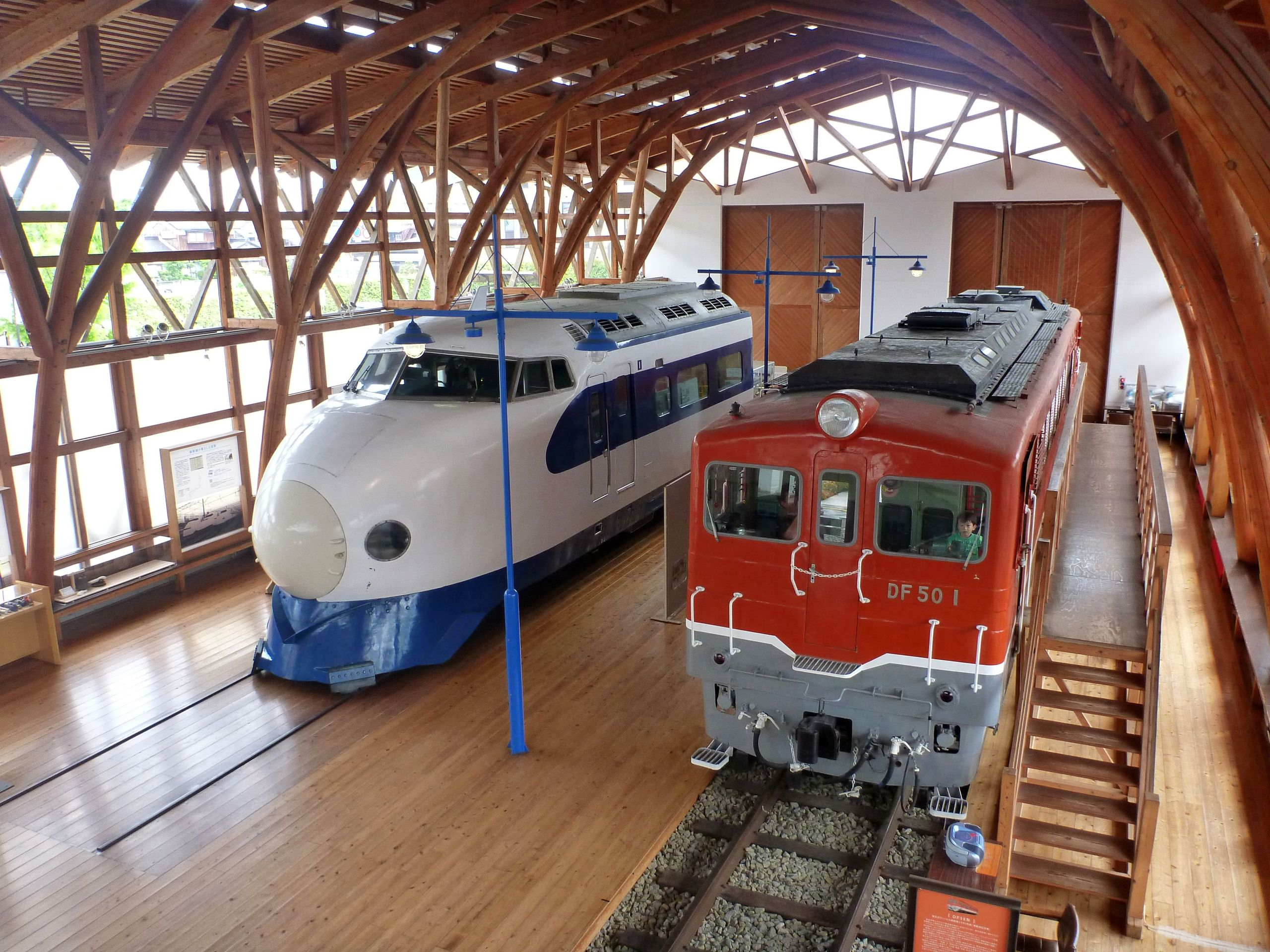
Preserved DF50 1 at The Railway History Park in Saijo in May 2015

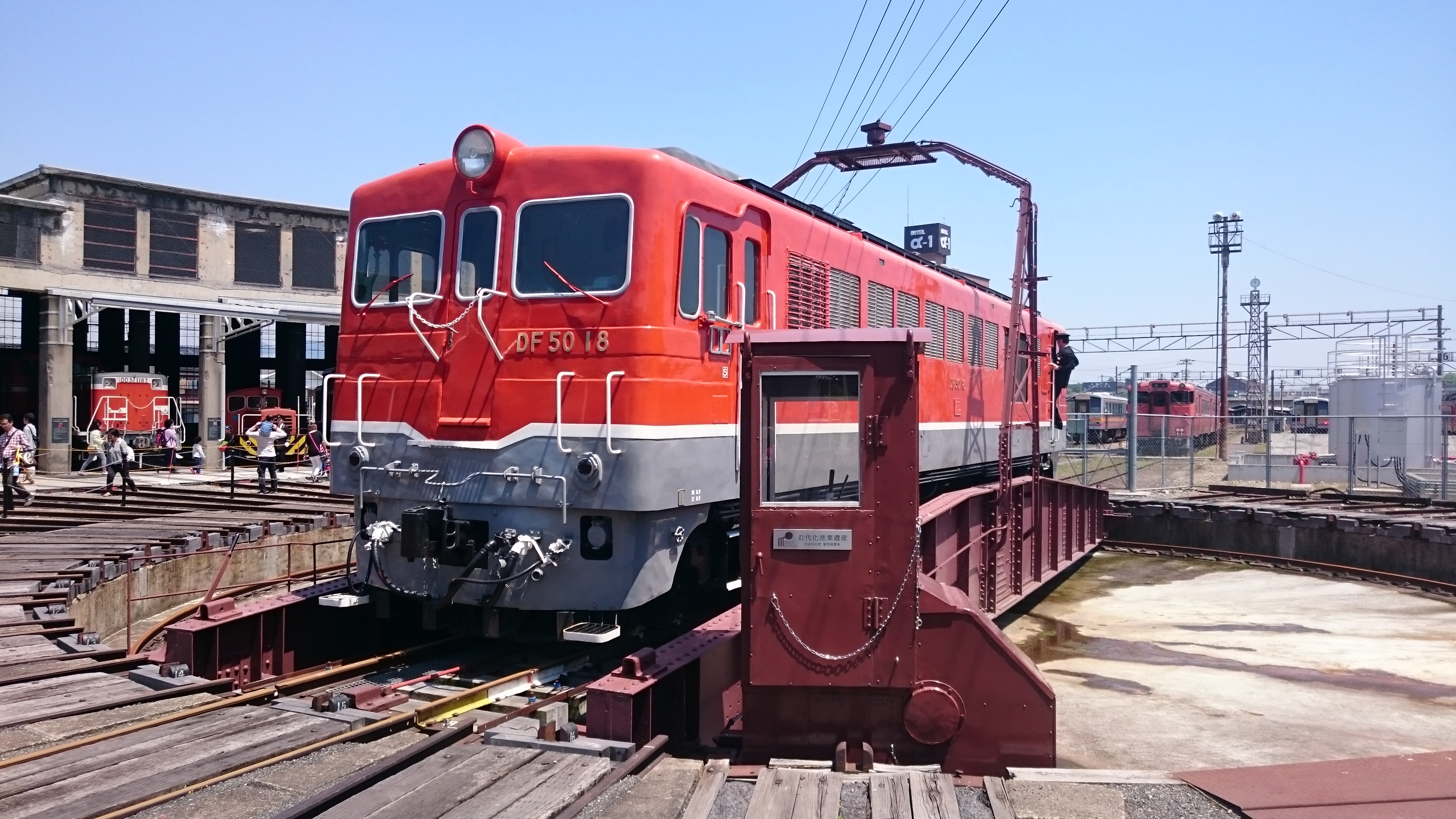
Preserved DF50 18 at the Tsuyama Railroad Educational Museum in May 2016

== Classification ==
The DF50 classification for this locomotive type is explained below.

- D: Diesel locomotive
- F: Six driving axles
- 50: Locomotive with maximum speed exceeding 85 km/h
