= Tsuyama Railroad Educational Museum =

- 津山まなびの鉄道館
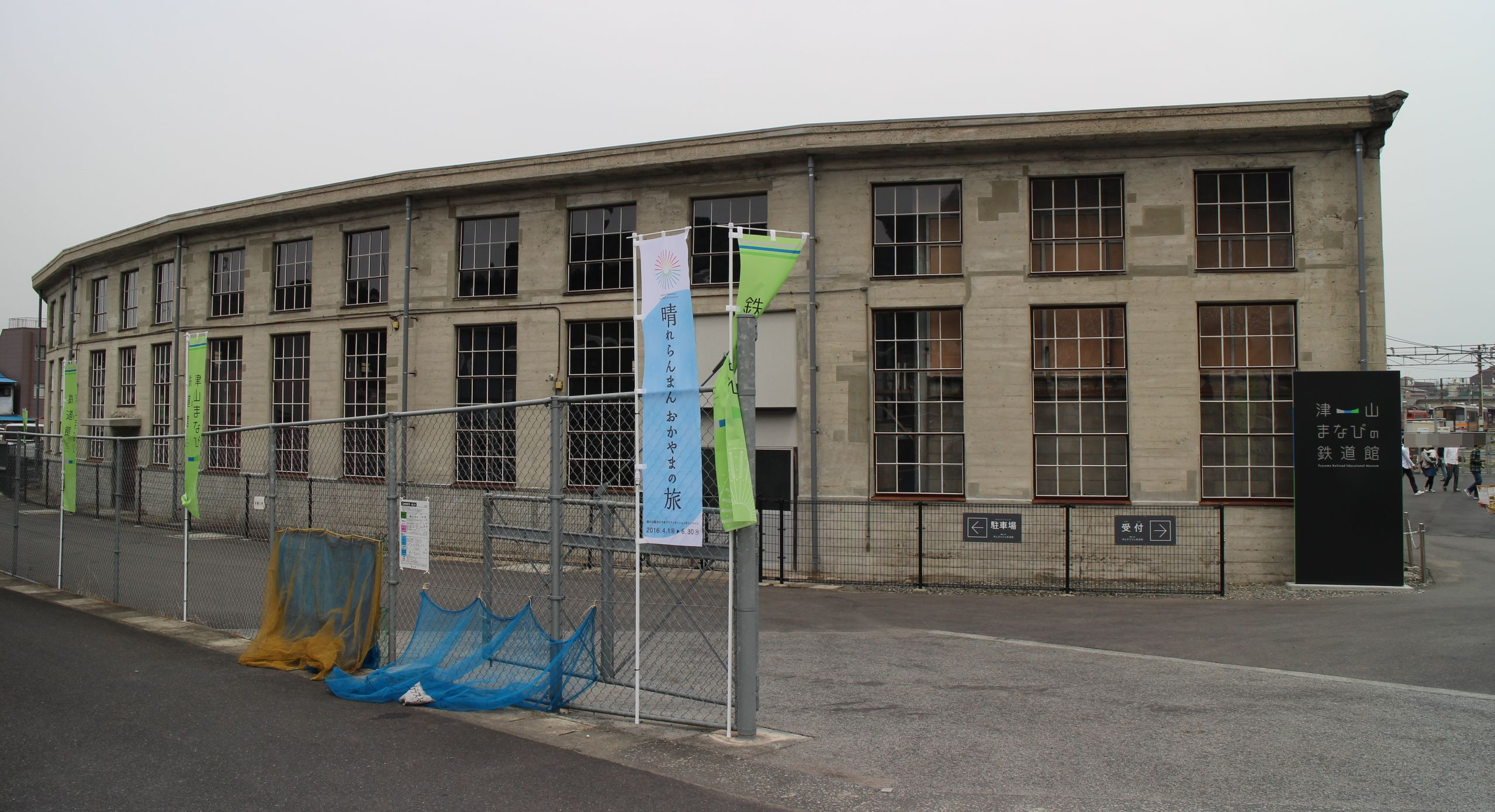
- The entrance in April 2016

- Location within Japan
- Established: 2 April 2016
- Location: Tsuyama, Okayama, Japan
- Coordinates: 35.053320°N 133.999782°E
- Type: Railway museum
- Public transit access: Tsuyama Station
- Website: www.tsuyamakan.jp/manabi

Tsuyama Railroad Educational Museum (津山まなびの鉄道館, Tsuyama Manabi no Tetsudōkan) is a railway museum in Tsuyama, Okayama, Japan, operated by West Japan Railway Company (JR West) since 2 April 2016. It is based around the former Tsuyama Depot roundhouse, which was used to house a number of preserved locomotives since 2007.

== Exhibits ==
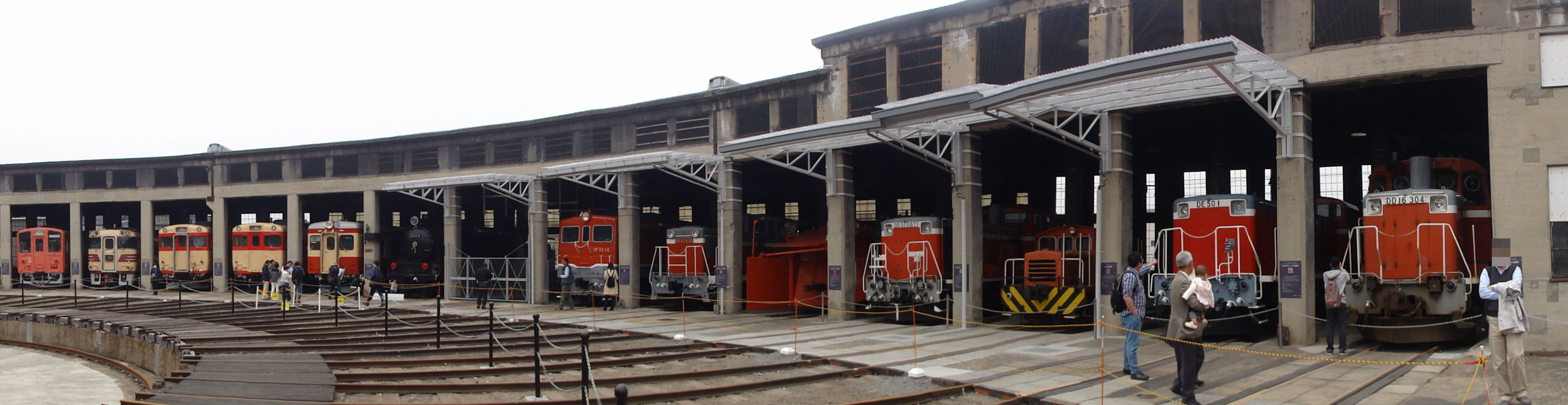
The roundhouse and preserved rolling stock in April 2016

A total of 13 rolling stock exhibits are housed at the museum, including the nine vehicles previously preserved inside the roundhouse and vehicles moved from the former Modern Transportation Museum in Osaka which closed in April 2014.

=== Steam locomotives ===
- Class D51 steam locomotive number D51 2

Built in 1936 by Kawasaki Sharyo. Preserved at the former Modern Transportation Museum in Osaka following withdrawal in 1971. Moved from the Modern Transportation Museum in March 2015.

=== Diesel locomotives ===
- 10 t diesel shunting locomotive

Built in 1974 by Kyosan Kogyo, and preserved at Tsuyama since 2011.

- Class DD13 diesel locomotive number DD13 638

Built in 1967 by Nippon Sharyo. Preserved at the former Modern Transportation Museum in Osaka following withdrawal in 1986.

- Class DD15 diesel locomotive snowplough unit number DD15 30

Built in 1964 by Nippon Sharyo. Previously operated by Toyama Chiho Railway, and moved to Tsuyama following its withdrawal in 2011.

- Class DD16-300 diesel locomotive snowplough unit number DD16 304

Built in 1972 by Kawasaki Heavy Industries as DD16 13, and converted to become a snowplough unit in 1983. Withdrawn in 2015.

- Class DD51 diesel locomotive number DD51 1187

Built in 1977 and withdrawn from service in 2007.

- Class DE50 diesel locomotive DE50 1

Built in 1970, withdrawn from service in 1986, and moved to Tsuyama in 2002.

- Class DF50 diesel locomotive DF50 18

Built in 1958, and preserved at the former Modern Transportation Museum in Osaka following withdrawal in 1984. Moved from the former Modern Transportation Museum in March 2015.

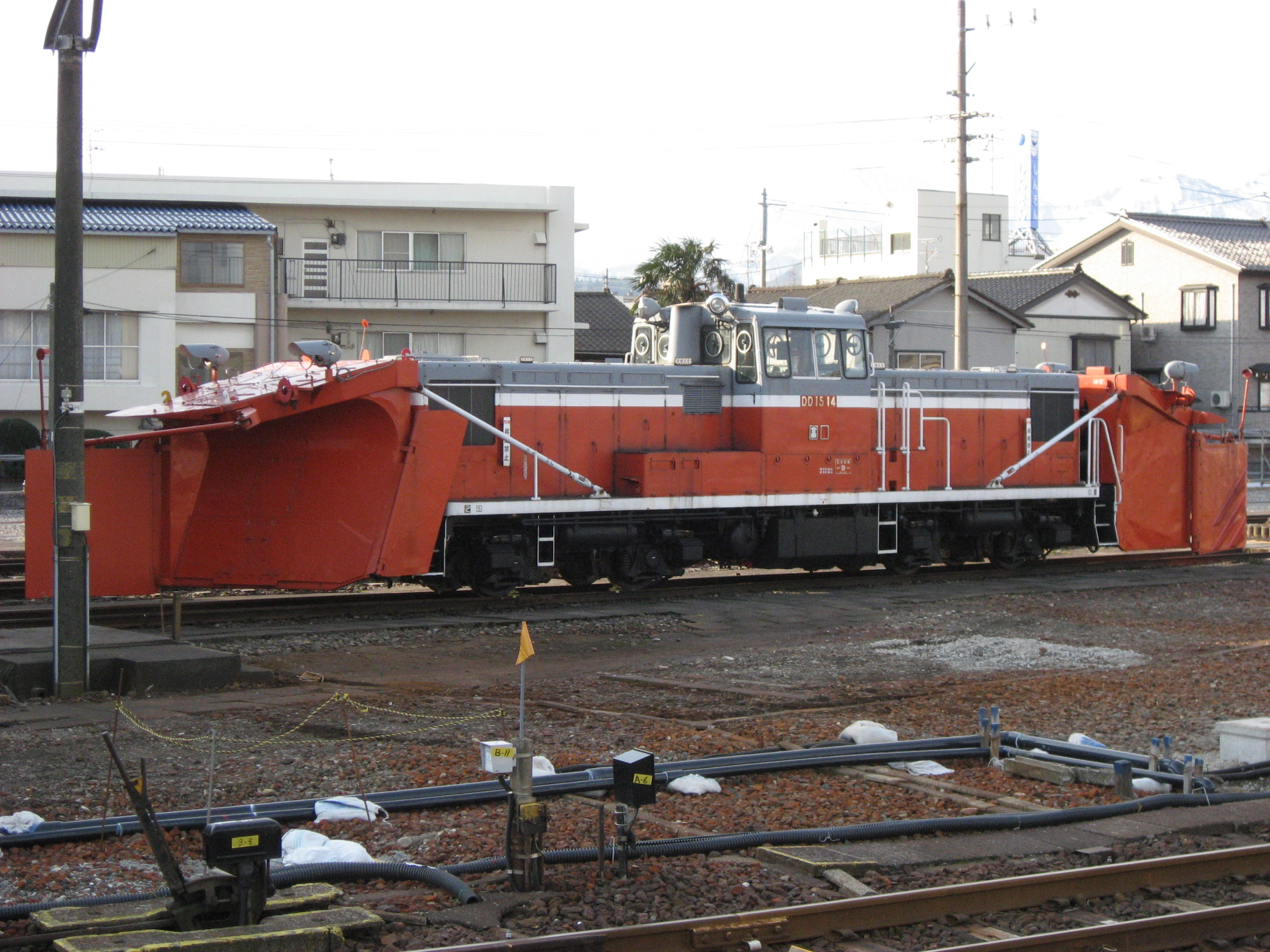
A Class DD15

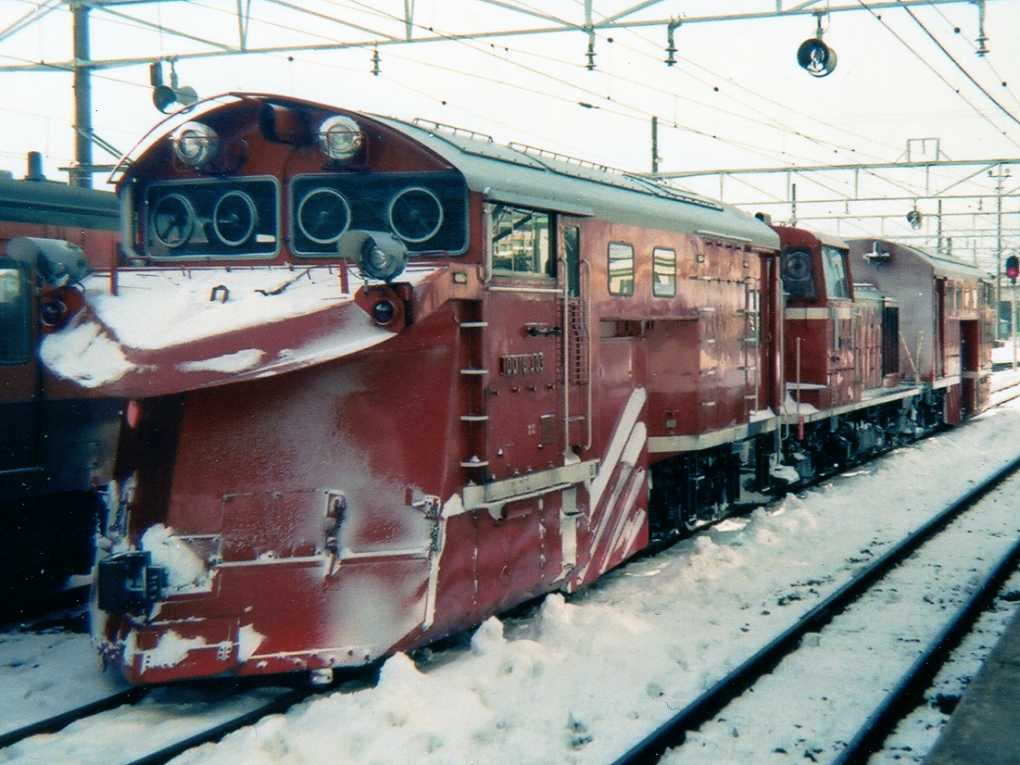
A Class DD16-300 snowplough unit

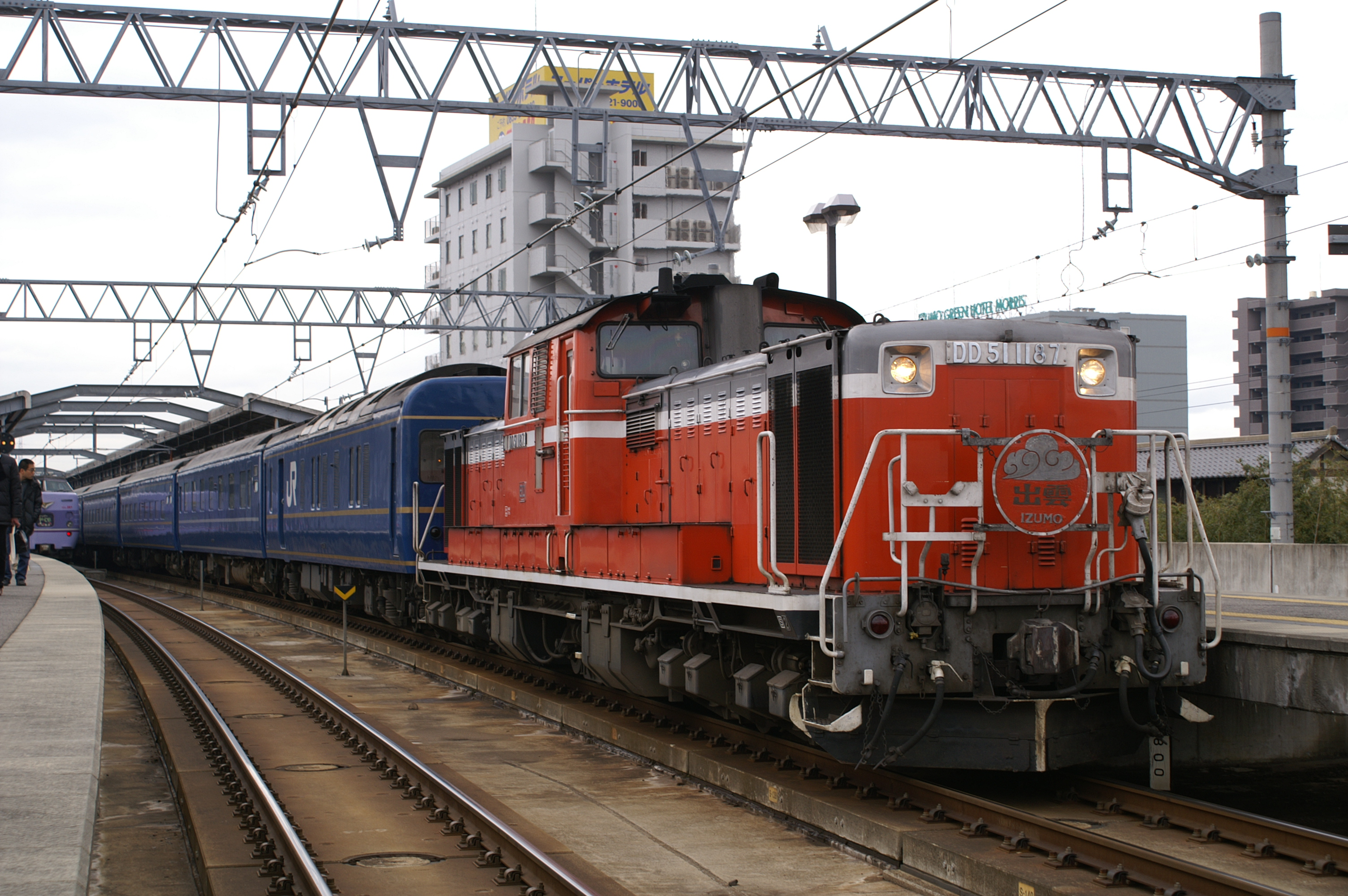
DD51 1187 in service in 2006

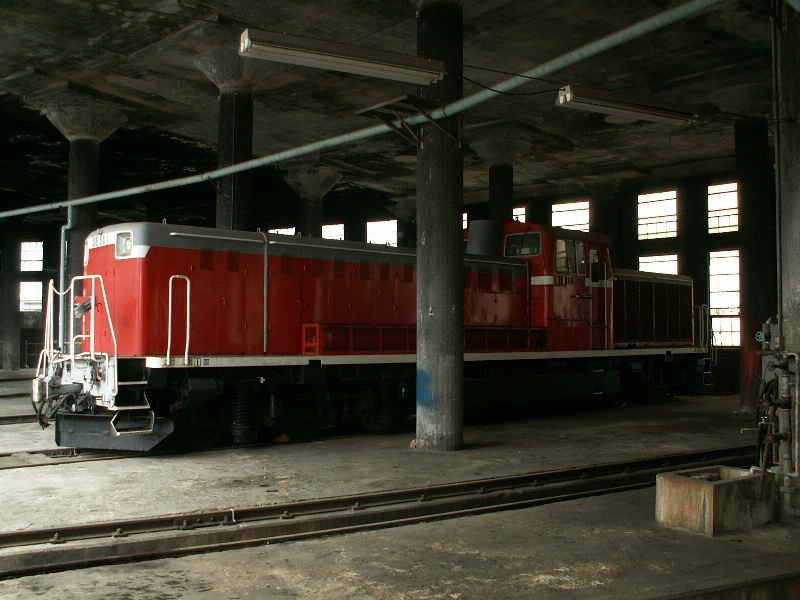
DE50 1 inside the roundhouse in May 2007

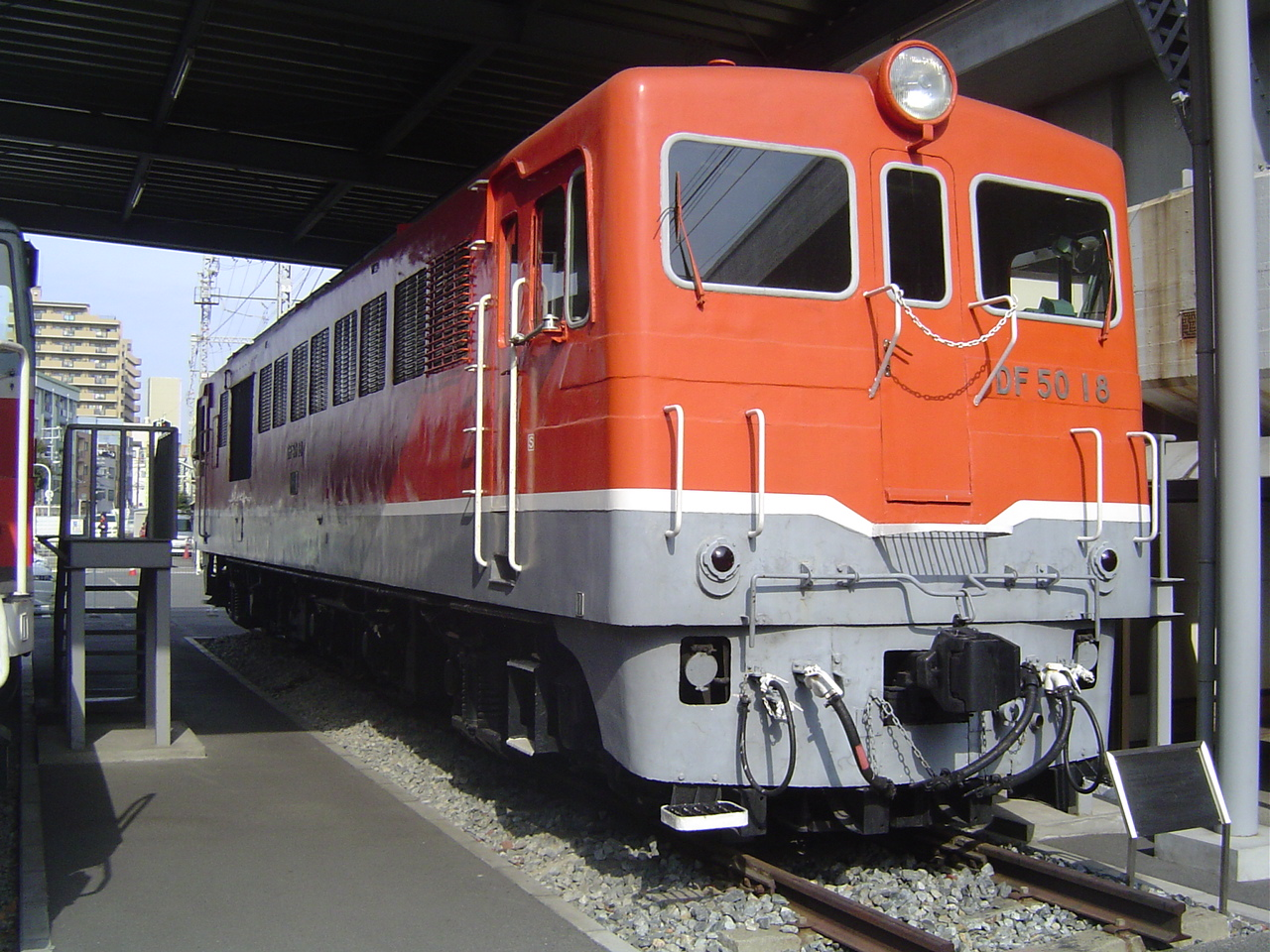
DF50 18 at the Modern Transportation Museum in Osaka in January 2007

=== Diesel multiple units ===
- KiHa 33-1001

Built in 1978 as passenger coach OHa 50-5, converted to become a diesel car in 1988, and withdrawn from service in 2010.

- KiHa 52-115

Built in 1965 by Niigata Tekko, and withdrawn from service in 2010.

- KiHa 58-563 + KiHa 28-2329

KiHa 58-563 was built in 1964 and withdrawn from service in 2010.
KiHa 28-2329 was built in 1964 as KiHa 28-329, and renumbered KiHa 28-2329 in 1969 following the addition of air-conditioning.

- KiHa 181-12

Built in 1969 by Nippon Sharyo for use on Oki and later Hamakaze, and withdrawn from service in 2011.

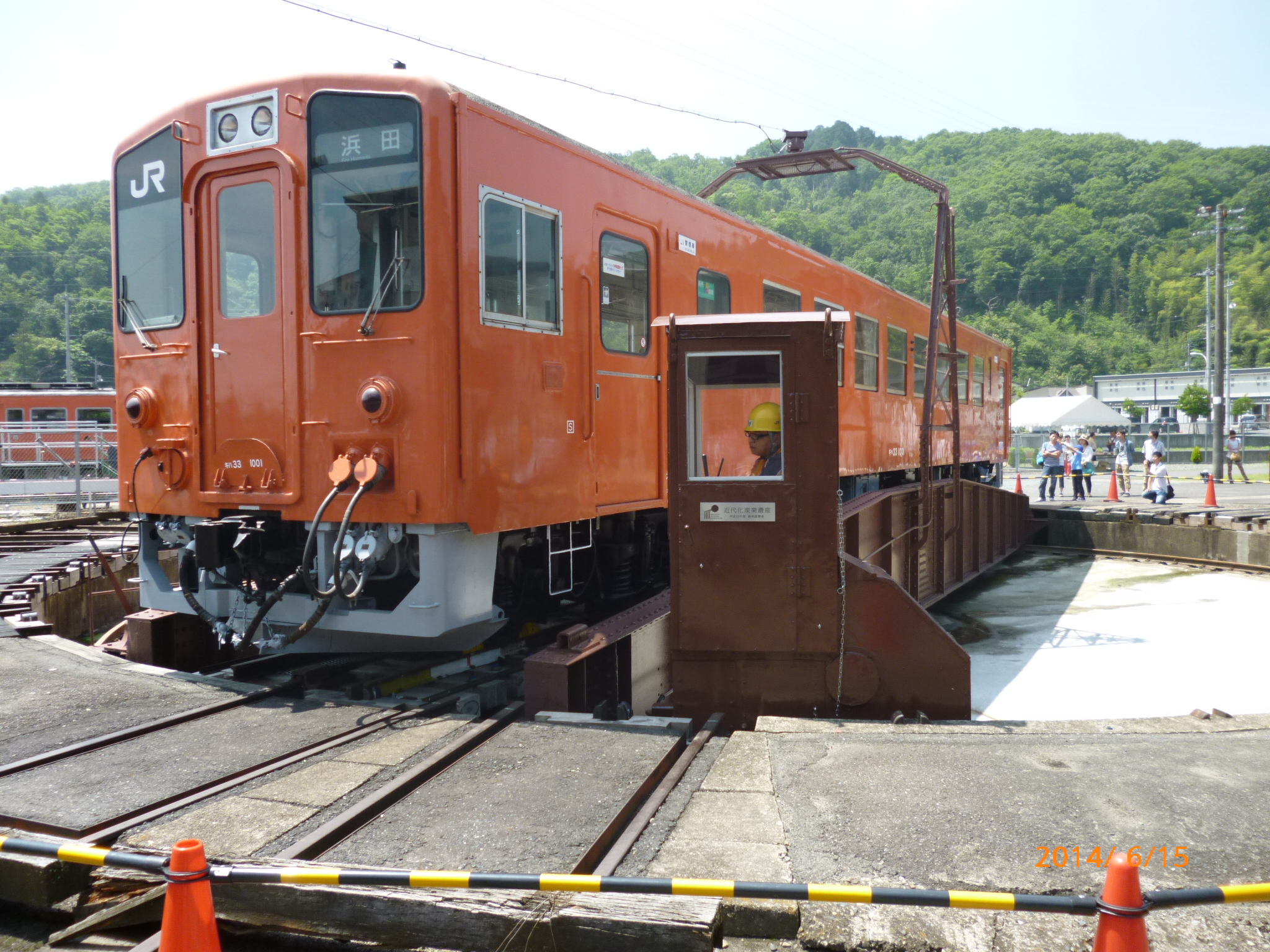
KiHa 33-1001 on the roundhouse tyrntable in 2014

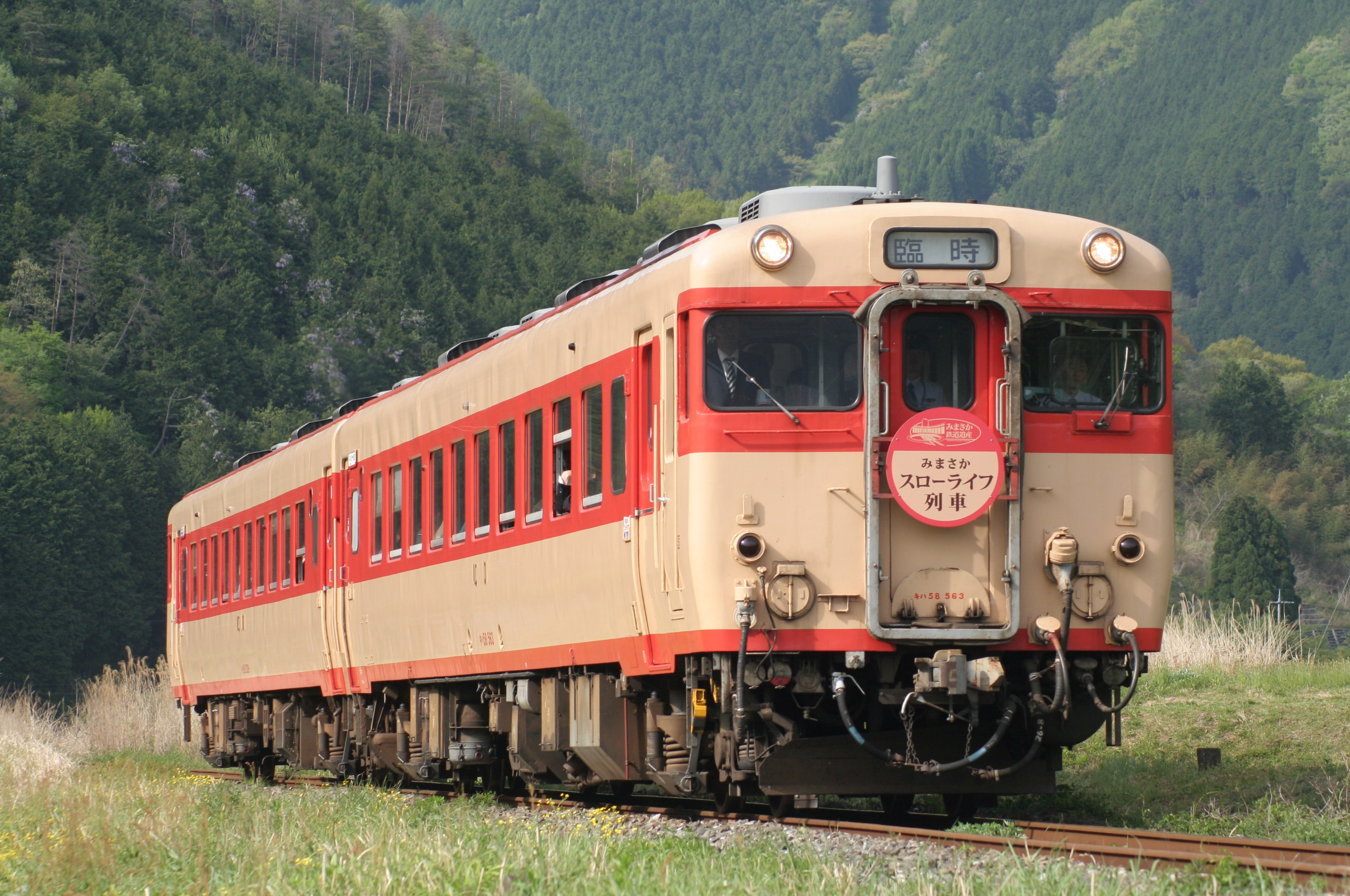
KiHa 58-563 + KiHa 28-2329 in service

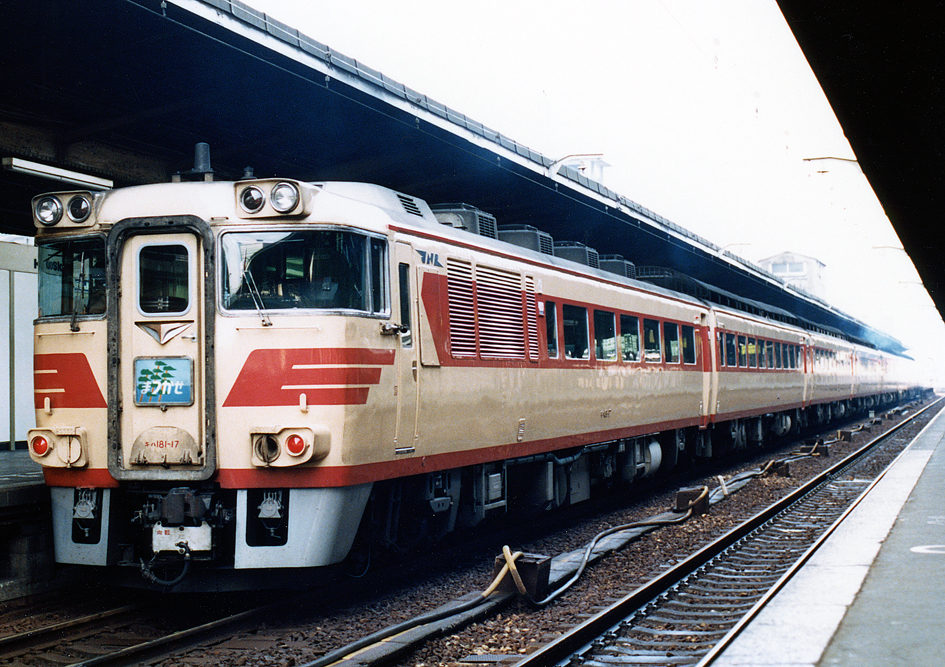
A KiHa 181 DMU in service

== History ==
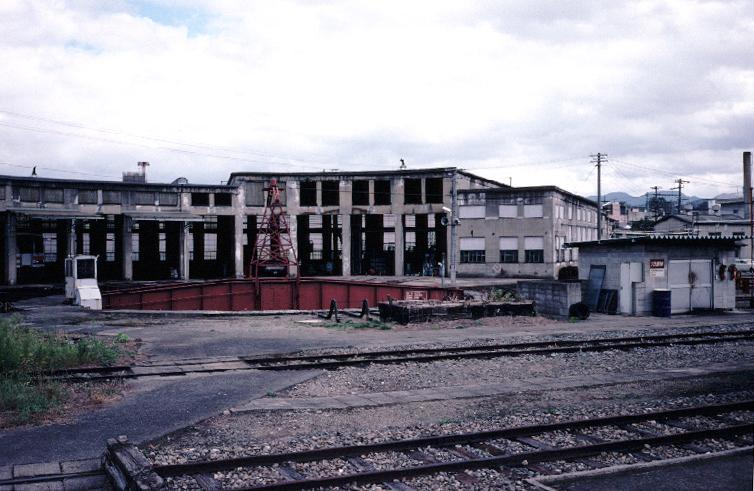
The depot in 1998

The roundhouse structure was built in 1936 as part of Tsuyama Locomotive Depot, and originally contained 17 storage tracks (of which 11 remain).

The museum opened on 2 April 2016.

== Access ==
The site is located close to Tsuyama Station on the Kishin Line and Tsuyama Line.

== See also ==
- List of railway museums
- Umekoji Steam Locomotive Museum, JR West roundhouse and museum in Kyoto
