= JNR Class DD51 =

Japanese diesel-hydraulic locomotive

Class DD51
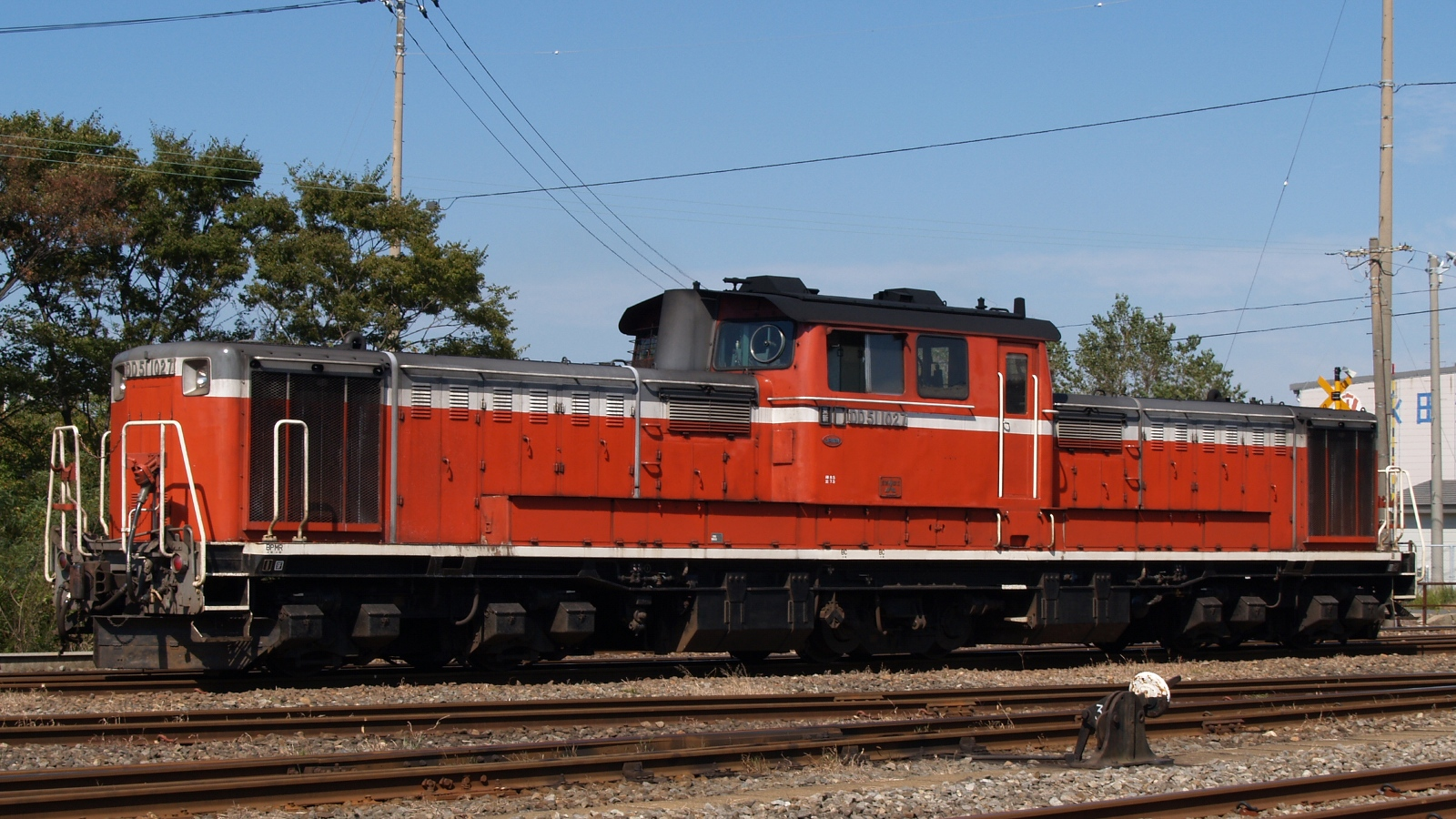
- DD51 1027 in October 2007
Type and origin
- Power type: Diesel-hydraulic
- Builder: Hitachi, Kawasaki, Mitsubishi
- Build date: 1962–1978
- Total produced: 649
Specifications
- Configuration
  - UIC: B'2'B'
- Gauge: 1,067 mm (3 ft 6 in); 1,000 mm (3 ft 3 3/8 in) metre gauge (Myanmar, Thailand)
- Wheel diameter: 860 mm (34 in)
- Length: 18,000 mm (59 ft 1 in)
- Width: 2,951–2,971 mm (9 ft 8.2 in – 9 ft 9.0 in)
- Height: 3,956 mm (12 ft 11.7 in)
- Loco weight: 84 t (83 long tons; 93 short tons)
- Fuel type: Diesel
- Prime mover: DML61S (2)
- Engine type: V12, four-stroke, turbocharged diesel engine, 1100 horsepower
- Transmission: Hydraulic
- Loco brake: Hydrodynamic, Air
- Train brakes: Air
Performance figures
- Maximum speed: 95 km/h (60 mph)
- Power output: 2,200 hp (1,600 kW)
Career
- Operators: JNR; JR Hokkaido; JR East; JR Central; JR West; JR Freight; Myanmar Railways; AS Associated Engineering (Not related to State Railway of Thailand Can use shared routes)
- Number in class: 15 (as of 1 December 2024)
- Disposition: Operational

The Class DD51 (DD51形) is a B-2-B wheel arrangement diesel-hydraulic locomotive type operated in Japan since 1962. 649 locomotives were built between 1962 and 1978 by Kawasaki Sharyo, Hitachi, and Mitsubishi. The class was designed for mainline passenger and freight use with more power than the D51 and a higher maximum speed than the C62 steam locomotive classes. This was achieved by installing two 1,100 hp engines in an 18 metre long centre-cab design, unusual for mainline operation. The V12 DML61 engines were developed from the 6-cylinder inline DMF31 engines used in the Class DD13 locomotives. As of 1 April 2016, 29 locomotives remained in operation.

== Variations ==
Locos numbered from DD51 501 to 799 and from 1001 to 1186 were equipped to operate in multiple, and locos numbered DD51 800 to 899 and 1801 to 1805 were built without steam generators for train heating.

== Liveries ==
All locomotives numbered from DD51 2 onwards were finished in the standard diesel livery of orange/red with grey upper surfaces separated by a white stripe. Re-engined locos operated by JR Freight in Hokkaido sport a livery based on the Class DF200 colour scheme, with no white stripe. These locomotives were used in pairs double-heading freight trains.

JR Hokkaido locos were all finished in the "Hokutosei" livery of blue with a gold stripe and shooting star logo. These were used in pairs for hauling sleeper trains (Hokutosei, Cassiopeia, and Twilight Express) between Hakodate and Sapporo.

DD51 592 (now withdrawn), and now DD51 791, was repainted in the "Euroliner" livery of pale blue with dark blue stripes for use with JR Central's "Euroliner" Joyful Train set.

DD51 842 was designated as the Imperial Train locomotive. Whereas regular members of the class have white handrails and edges to the running boards, they are polished stainless steel on this particular locomotive, as are the exhaust shrouds. Based at Takasaki Depot, it is also used for special excursion trains.

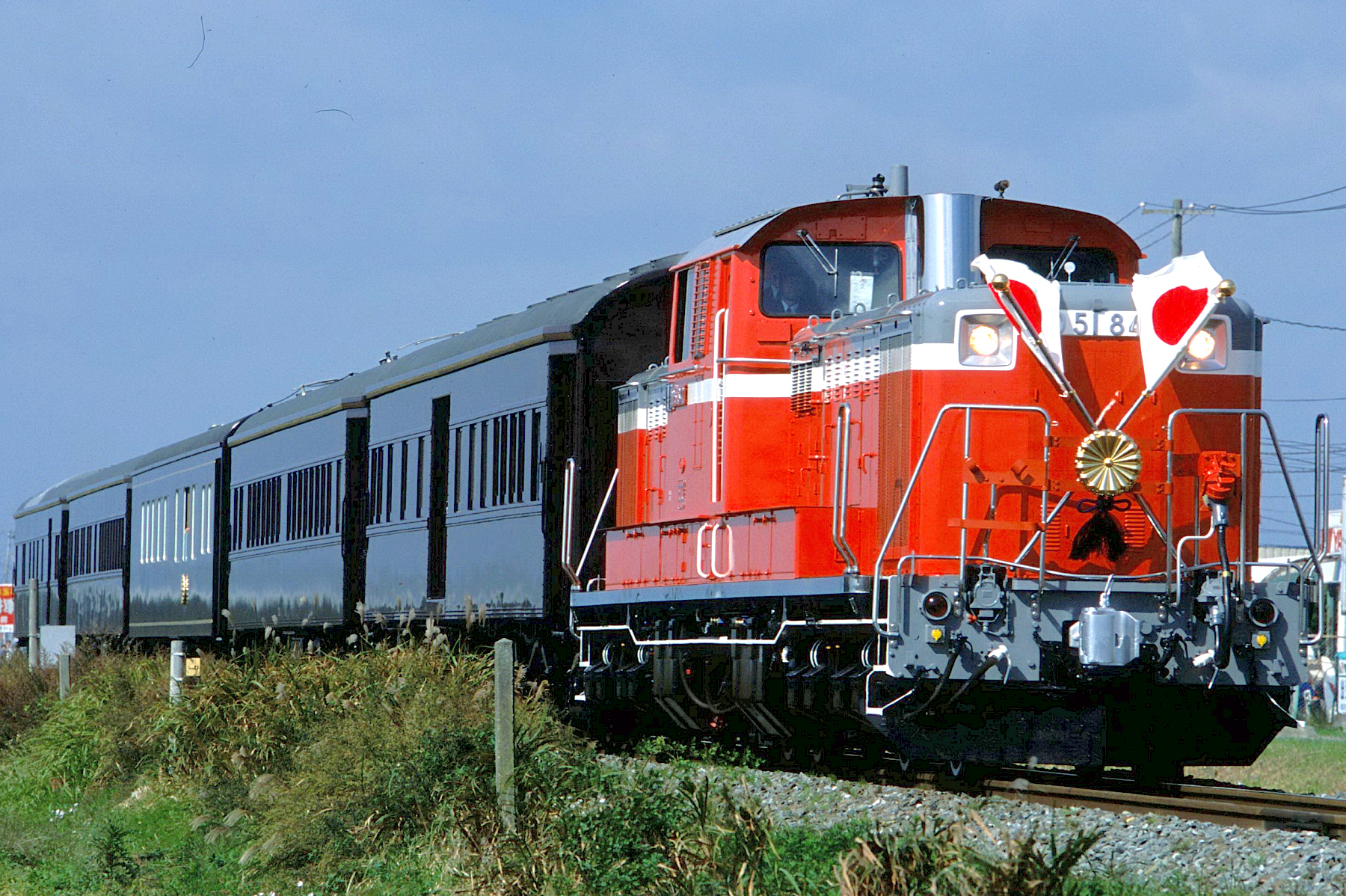
DD51 842 on an Imperial Train working in October 2001

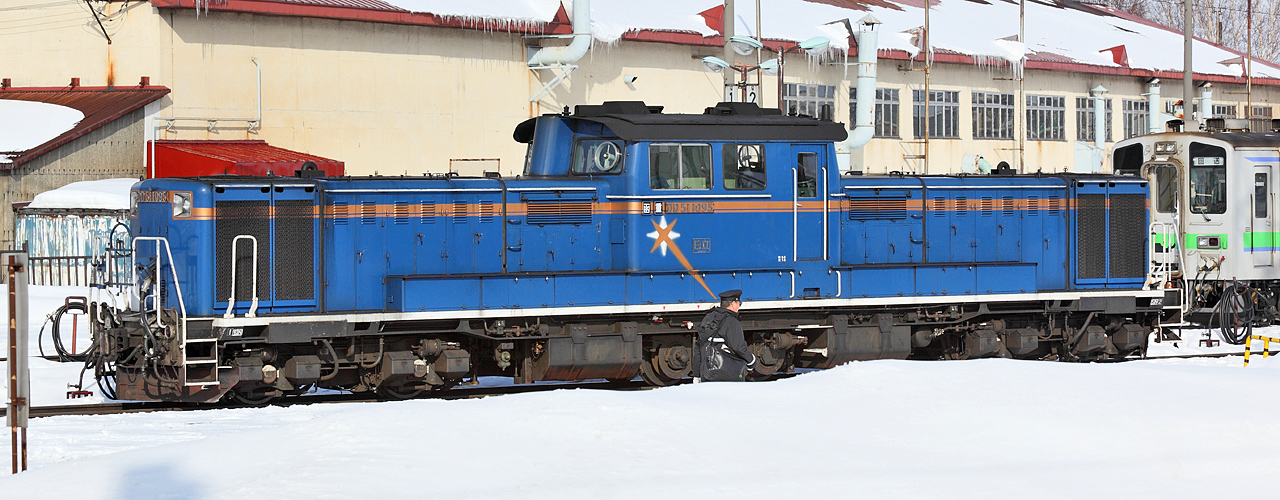
DD51 1095 in JR Hokkaido Hokutosei livery in February 2010

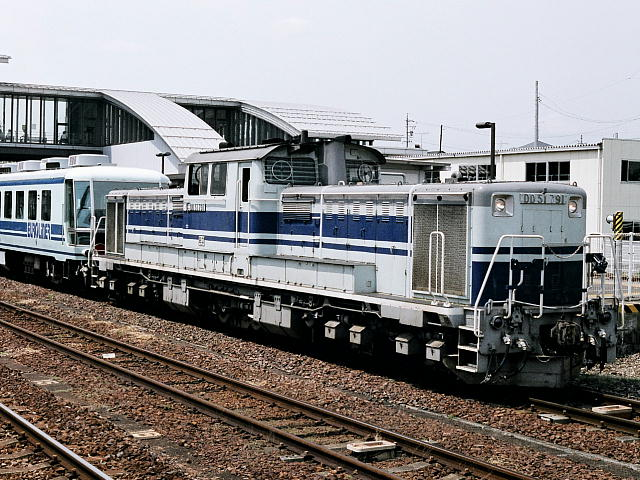
JR Central DD51 791 in Euro Liner livery

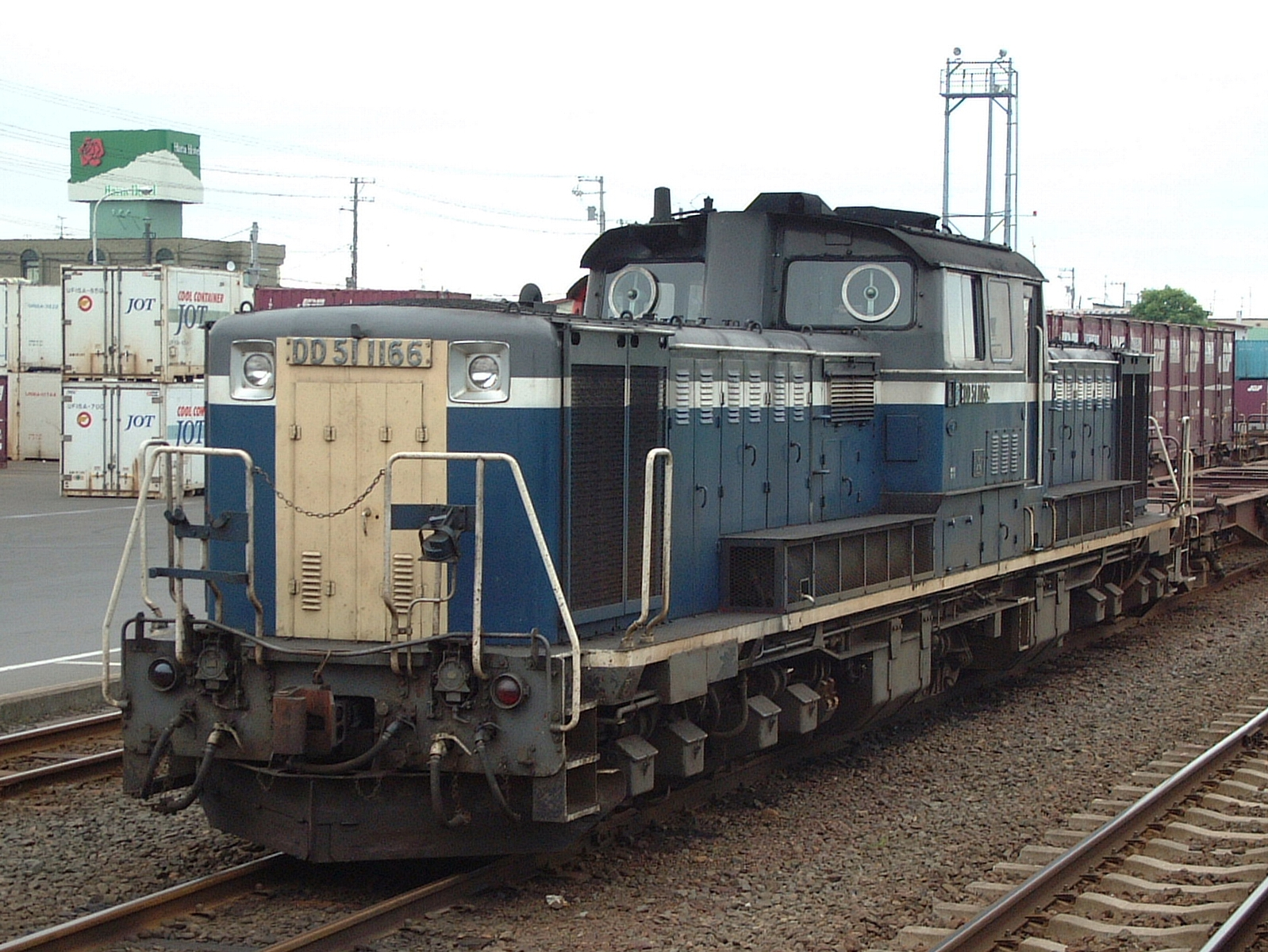
DD51 1166 in JR Freight blue livery initially applied to refurbished locomotives, July 2006

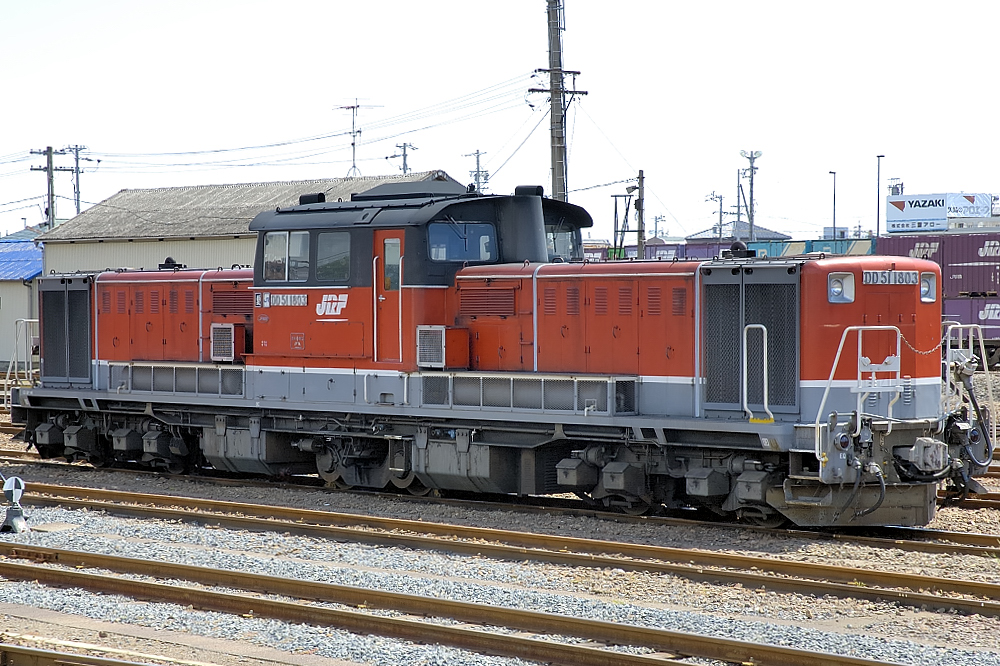
DD51 1803 in JR Freight red livery applied to refurbished locomotives, August 2007

== Refurbishment ==
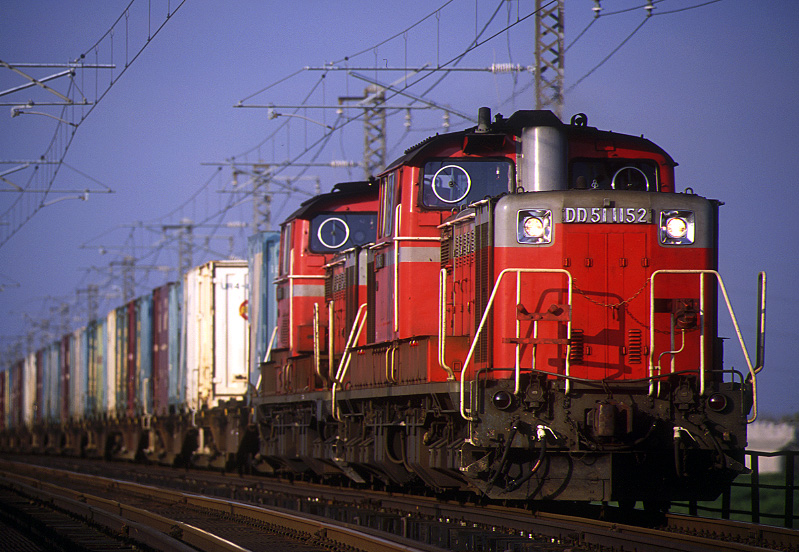
A pair of refurbished Hokkaido-based JR Freight DD51s led by D51 1152

Many of the JR Freight locomotive underwent life extension refurbishment, which included removal of steam generator equipment where still fitted. These locos are distinguished by a new livery of blue with grey upper surfaces separated by a white stripe, and cream end panels.

DD51 class locomotives also formed the basis for the DD17, DD18, and DD19 self-propelled snow plough units.

== Fleet allocation ==
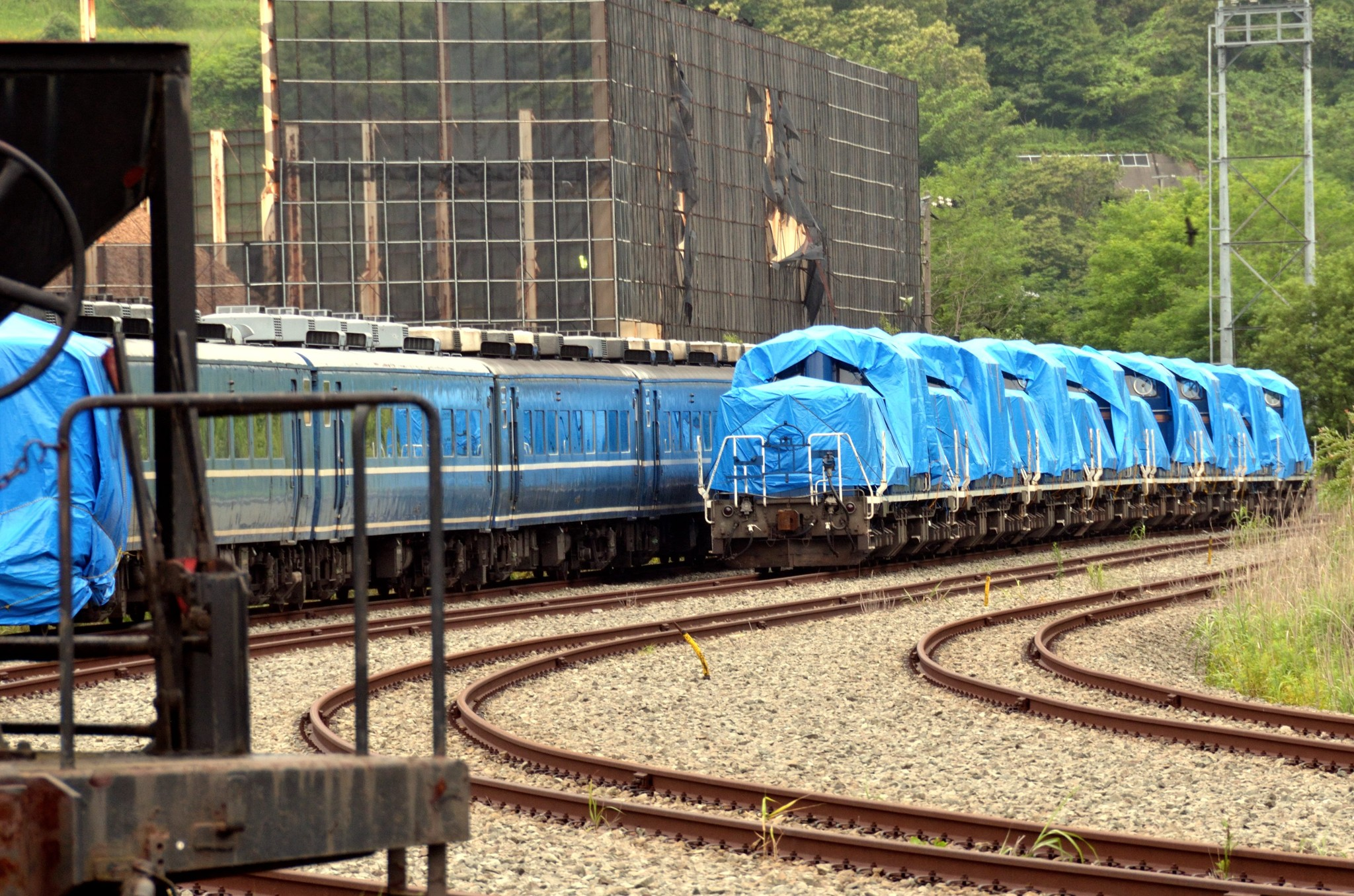
Eight withdrawn JR Hokkaido Class DD51s stored at Jinyamachi Rinkai Yard in July 2016

Following the privatization of Japanese National Railways (JNR) on 1 April 1987, JR Hokkaido received 25 locomotives, JR East received 29, JR Central received 4, JR West received 63, JR Kyushu received one locomotive, and JR Freight received 137.

As of 1 April 2016, 29 locomotives remained in operation, including 17 locomotives operated by JR Freight, four by JR East, and eight by JR West.

== Overseas operations ==
=== Myanmar ===
A number of Class DD51 locomotives have been shipped to Myanmar for use on the Myanmar Railways.

As of March 2016, the status of DD51s shipped to Myanmar is as follows.

Original number	Manufacturer	Date built	Last owner	Date withdrawn	Date shipped	MR number(s)	Status
DD51 797	Hitachi	November 1972	JR Freight	March 2003	2004	D2D.2201	Stored out of use
DD51 823	Hitachi	August 1970	JR Freight	June 2005	2005	D2D.2202	Status unknown
DD51 1070	Mitsubishi	February 1974	JR Freight	December 2005	2005	DD.1101	Cut up May 2015
DD51 1070	Mitsubishi	February 1974	JR Freight	December 2005	2005	DD.1102	Stored out of use
DD51 1001	Mitsubishi	October 1972	JR Freight	December 2005	2005	DD.1103	Stored out of use
DD51 1001	Mitsubishi	October 1972	JR Freight	December 2005	2005	DD.1104	Status unknown
DD51 1006	Mitsubishi	November 1972	JR Hokkaido	December 2008	2012	DF.2027	Awaiting conversion
DD51 1068	Mitsubishi	February 1974	JR Hokkaido	December 2008	2012	DF.2012	Awaiting conversion

Conversion included re-gauging from 1,067 mm (3 ft 6 in) to 1,000 mm (3 ft 3 3/8 in) and lowering the cab roof profile. Locomotives DD51 1070 and DD51 1001 were heavily rebuilt with parts from other locomotives to form four Bo-Bo wheel arrangement locomotives used for depot shunting work.

=== Thailand ===
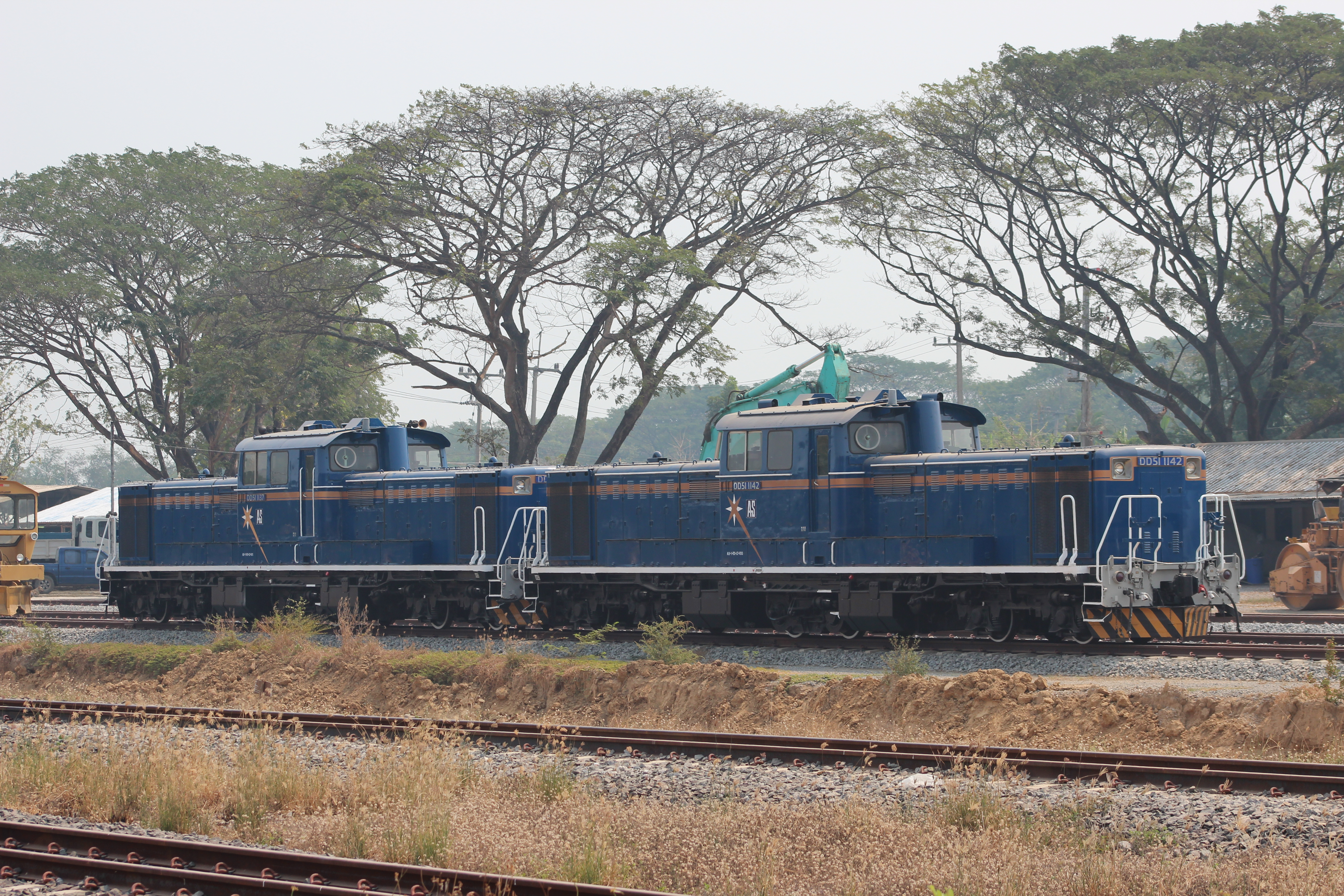
DD51 1137 and 1142 at Nong Pladuk Junction railway station

Two former Hokutousei DD51s were sent to Thailand for use during the conversion of some lines to double track. These were numbers DD51 1137 and DD51 1142.

== Preserved examples ==
As of April 2016, seven class DD51 locomotives are preserved:

- DD51 1: Preserved at the Usui Pass Railway Heritage Park in Gunma Prefecture.
- DD51 548: Preserved at Crawford Park in Mikasa, Hokkaido.
- DD51 610: Preserved at the Mikasa Railway Village in Mikasa, Hokkaido.
- DD51 615: Preserved at the Otaru Museum in Otaru, Hokkaido.
- DD51 756: Preserved at the Kyoto Railway Museum in Kyoto since April 2016.
- DD51 1040: Preserved at the Railway History Park next to Namikawa Station in Kameoka, Kyoto.
- DD51 1187: Preserved at the Tsuyama Railroad Educational Museum in Tsuyama, Okayama.

The prototype, DD51 1, with its unique, more rounded appearance, was moved to the Usui Pass Railway Heritage Park in April 1998 and repainted in its original livery of brown with white lining. This locomotive was withdrawn March 1986, and was subsequently stored at Takasaki Depot from March 1987.

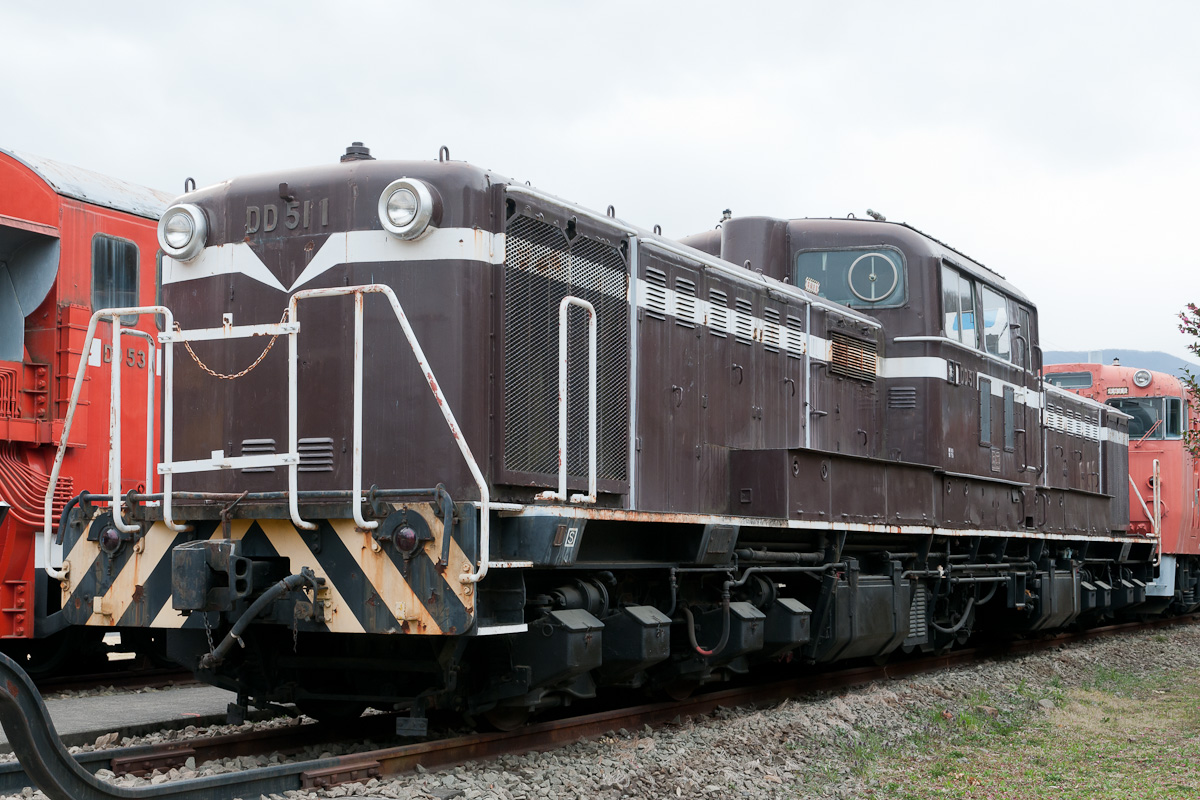
Prototype DD51 1 preserved at the Usui Pass Railway Heritage Park in April 2011

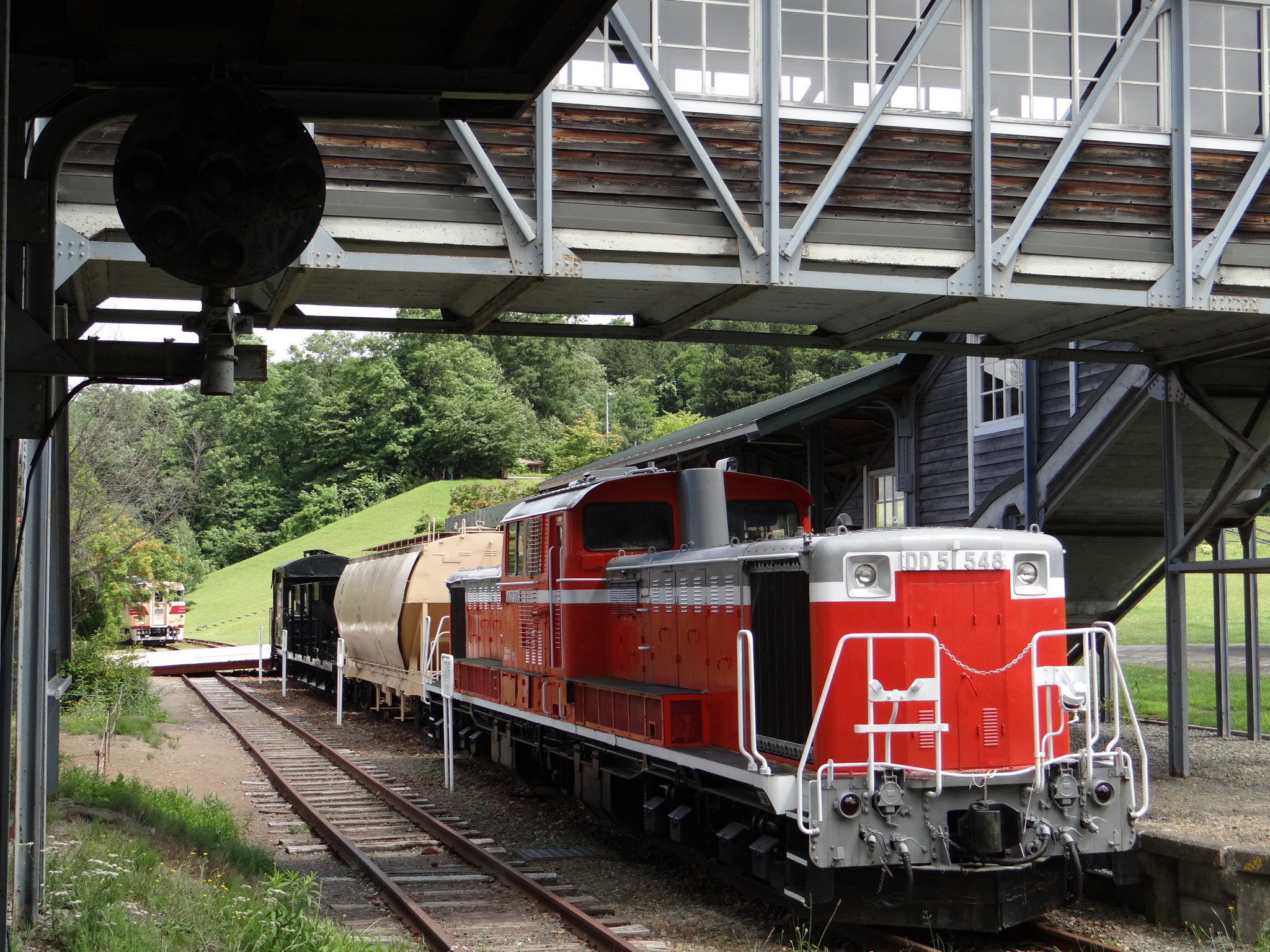
DD51 548 preserved at the Mikasa Railway Village in Hokkaido in August 2015

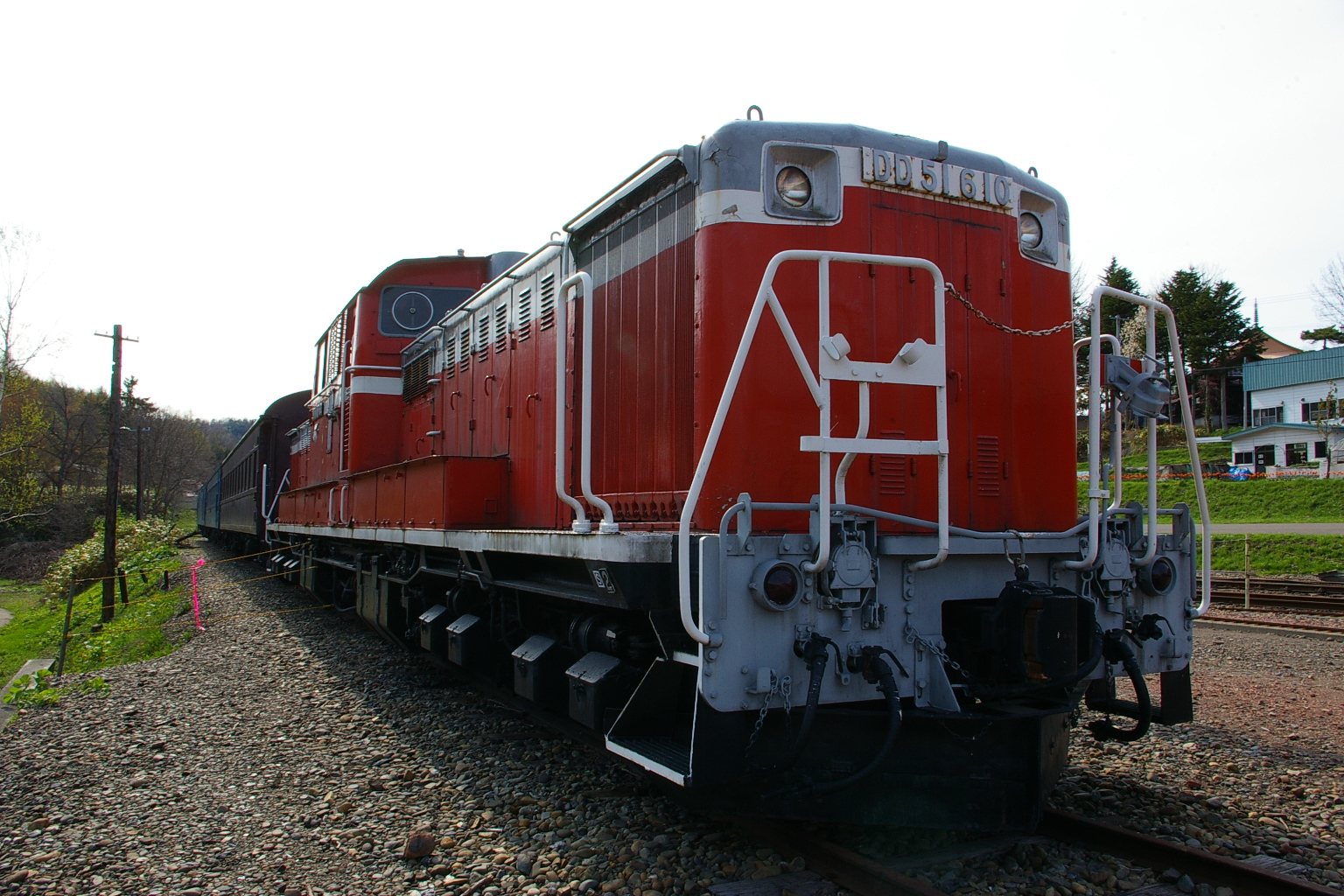
DD51 610 preserved at the Mikasa Railway Village in Hokkaido in May 2007

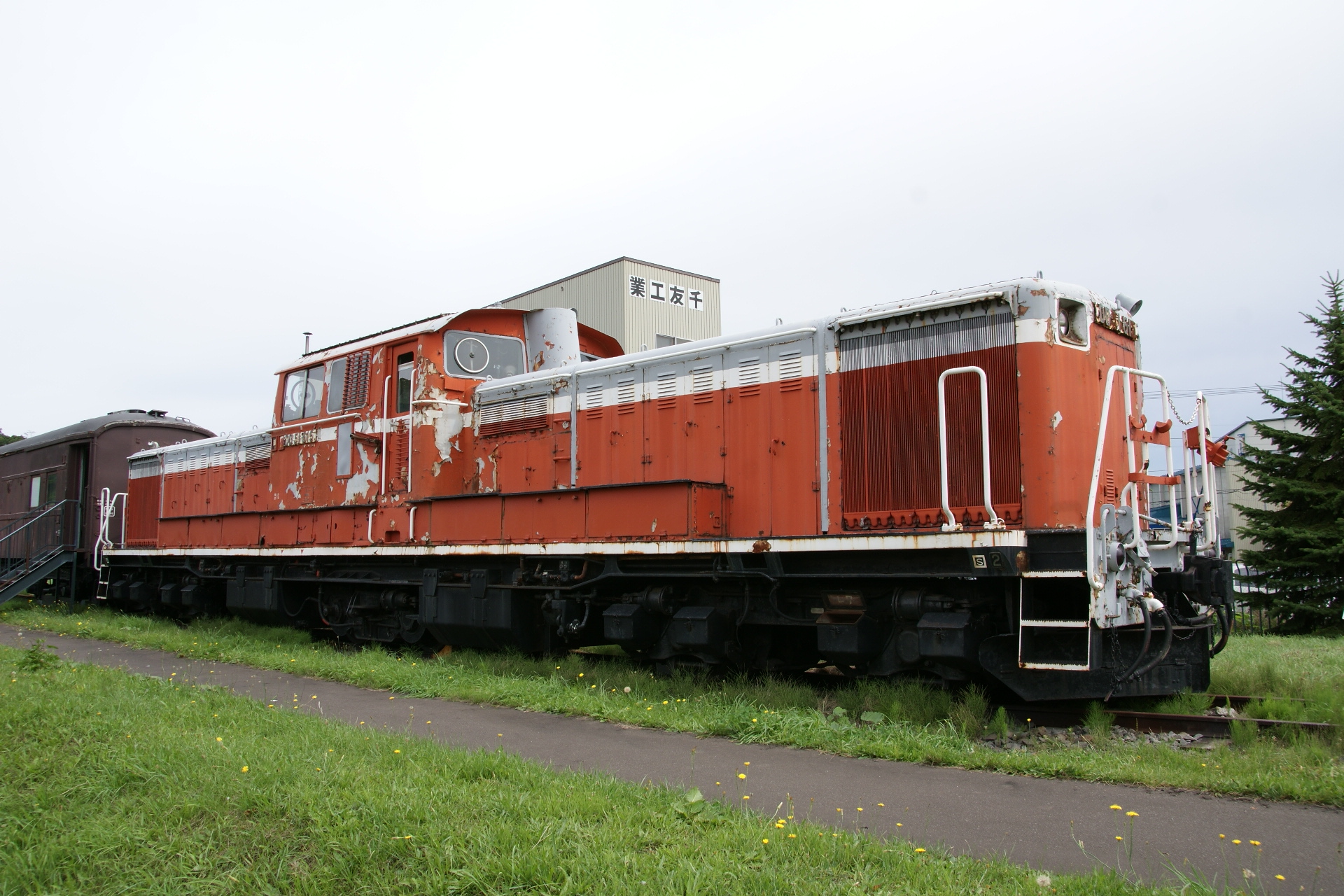
DD51 615 preserved at the Otaru Museum in Hokkaido in August 2009

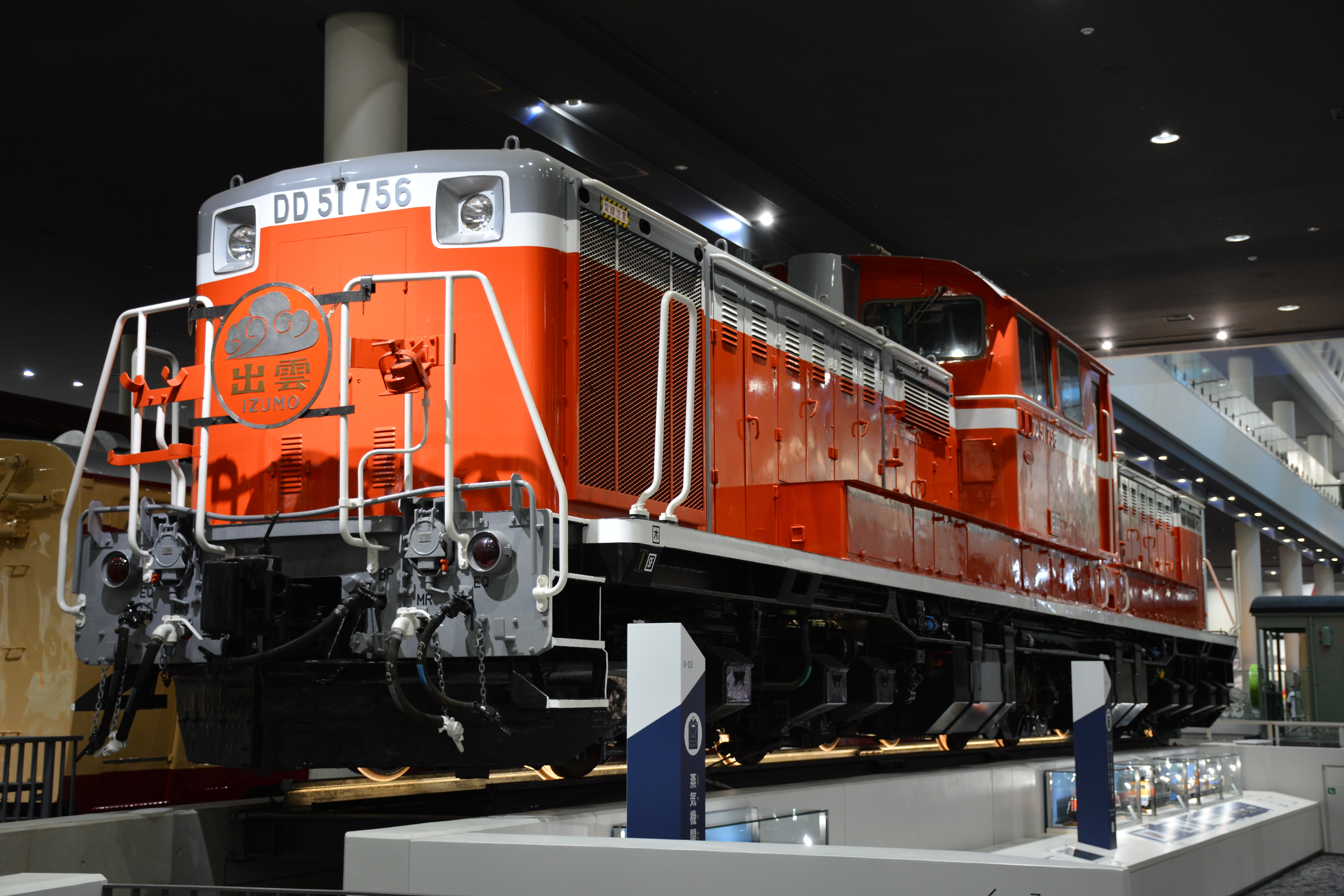
DD51 756 preserved at the Kyoto Railway Museum in October 2016

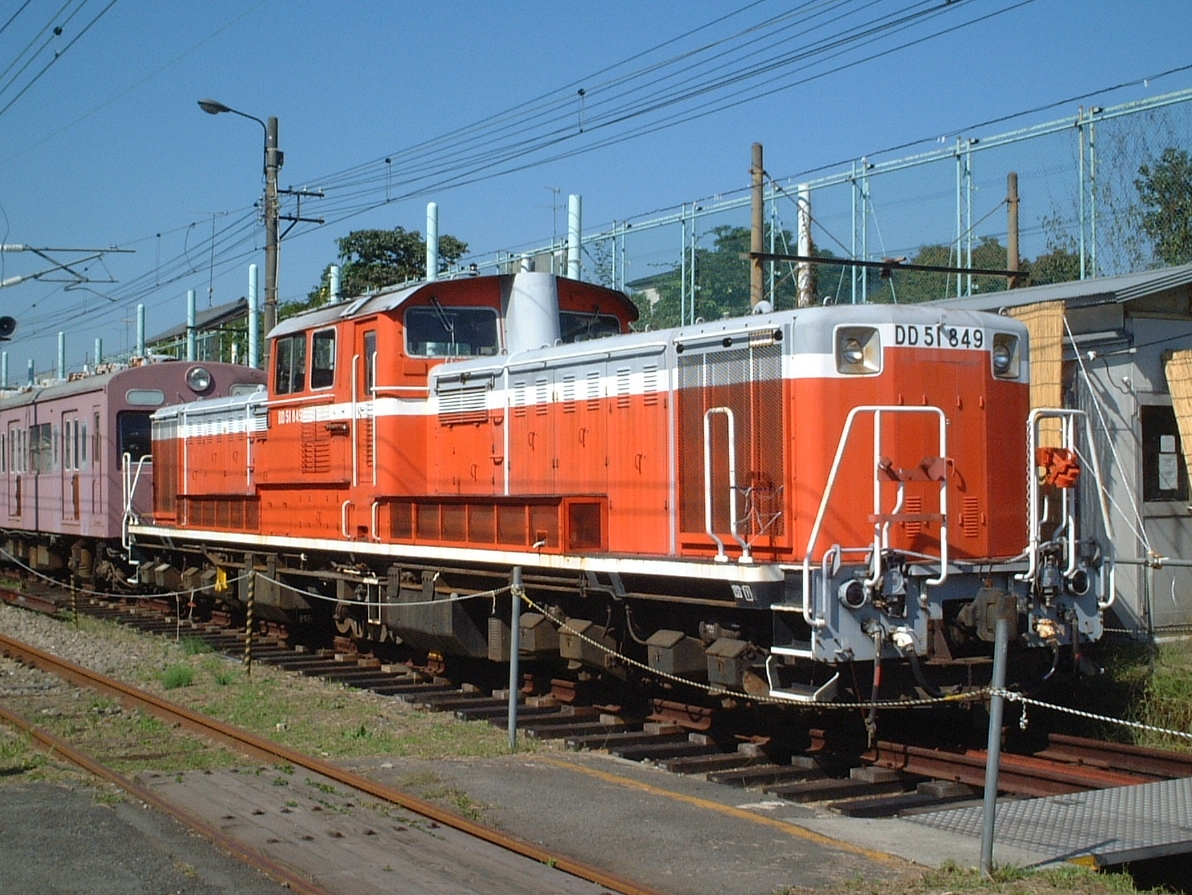
DD51 849 at the Railway Technical Research Institute (RTRI) facility in Kokubunji, Tokyo in October 2001

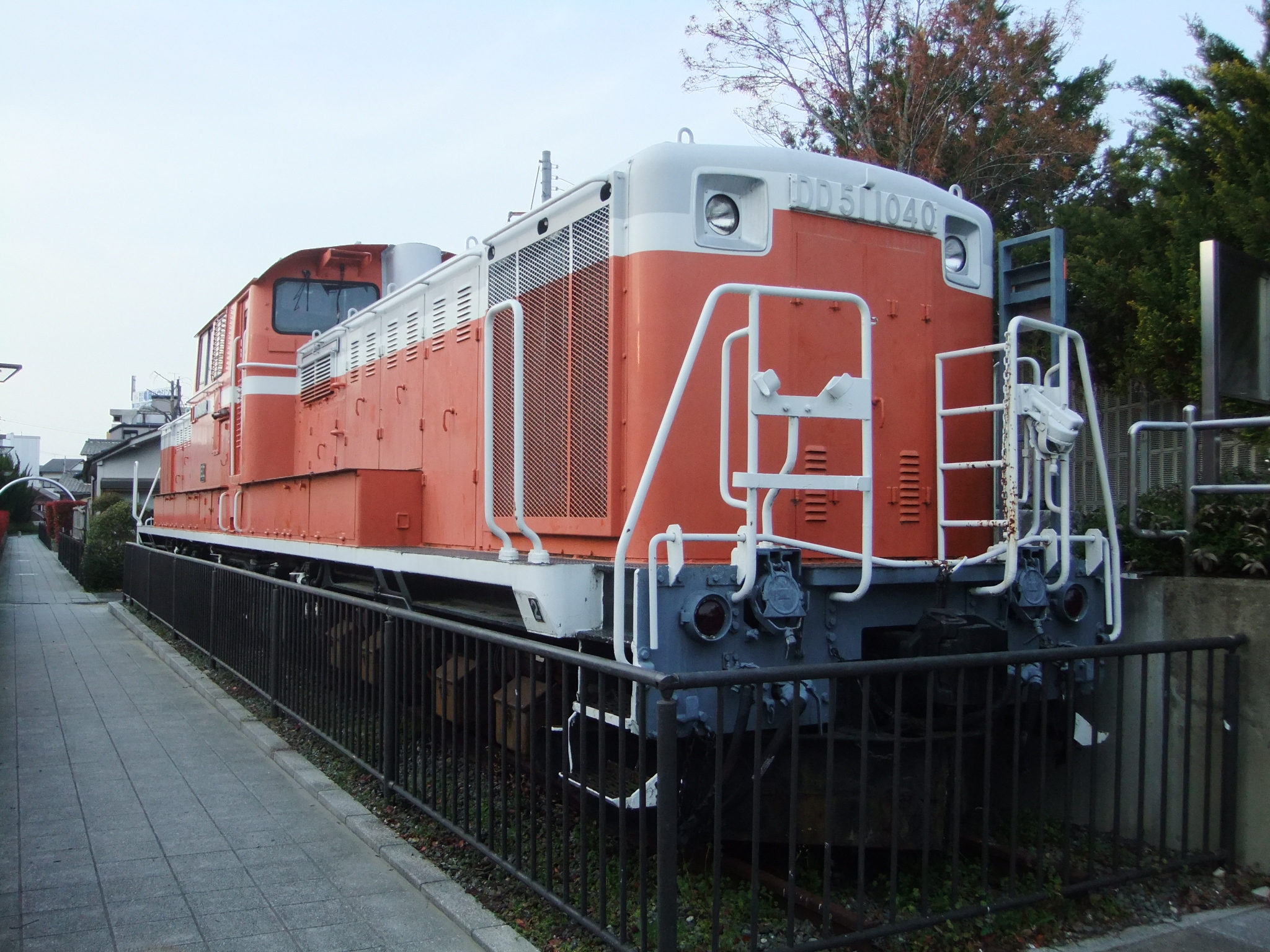
Preserved DD51 1040 in April 2014

== Classification ==
The DD51 classification for this locomotive type is explained below.

- D: Diesel locomotive
- D: Four driving axles
- 51: Locomotive with maximum speed exceeding 85 km/h

== In fiction ==
In Yaemon the Locomotive 3D there is a talking DD51 called Dimu which tries to scrap Yaemon.
