= Nonokuchi Station =

Railway station in Okayama, Japan

Nonokuchi Station 野々口駅
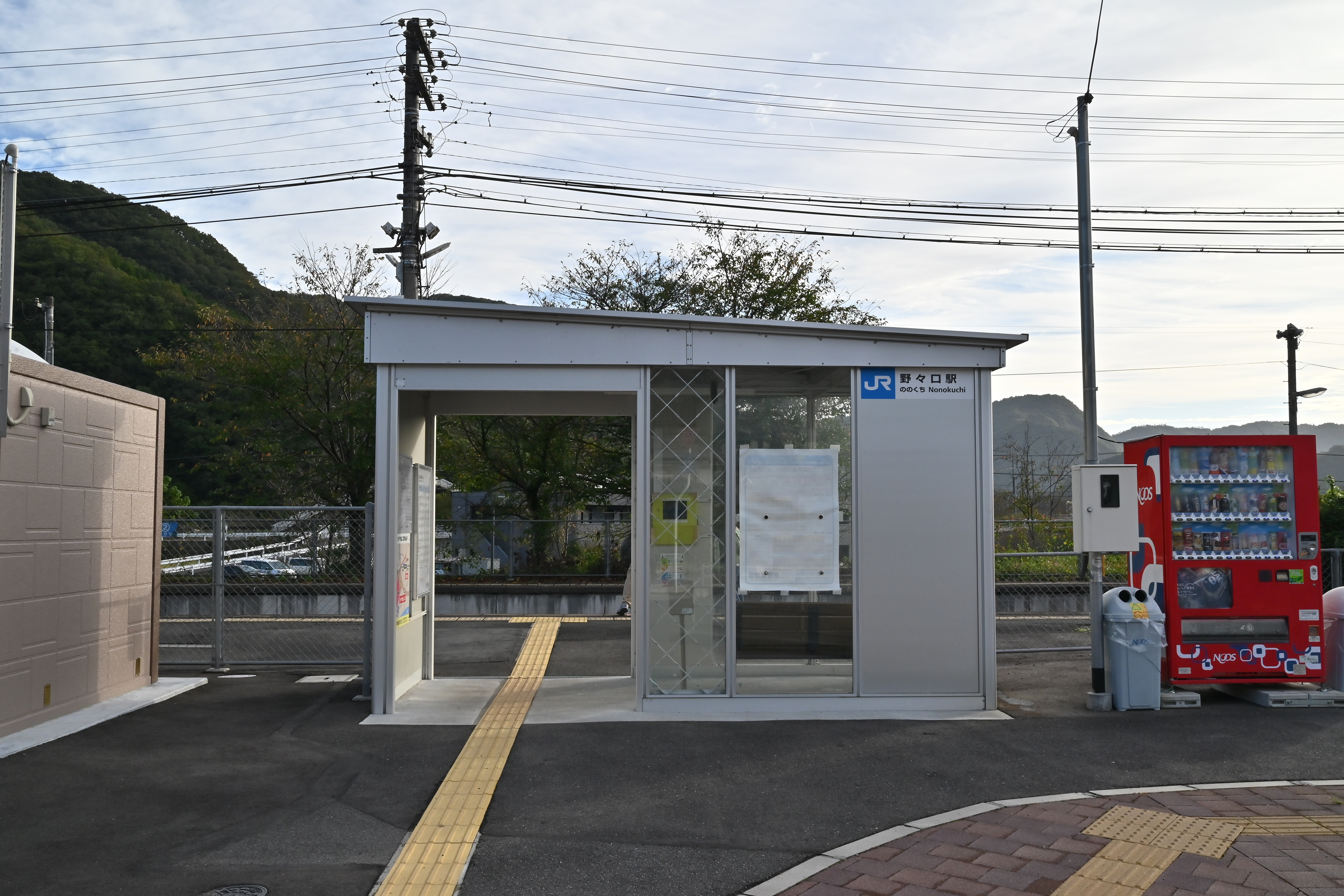
- Nonokuchi Station, October 2022

General information
- Location: Mitsuchō Nonokuchi 1135, Kita-ku, Okayama-shi, Okayama-ken 709-2117; Japan
- Coordinates: 34°46′16.57″N 133°55′56.70″E
- Owner: West Japan Railway Company
- Operator: West Japan Railway Company
- Line: T Tsuyama Line
- Distance: 16.7 km (10.4 miles) from Okayama
- Platforms: 2 side platforms
- Connections: Bus stop

Other information
- Status: Unstaffed
- Website: Official website

History
- Opened: 21 December 1898; 127 years ago

Passengers
- FY2019: 134 daily
Location
- Location within Okayama Prefecture Location within Japan

Nonokuchi Station (野々口駅, Nonokuchi-eki) is a passenger railway station located in the Takebe-chō neighborhood of Kita-ku of the city of Okayama, Okayama Prefecture, Japan. It is operated by West Japan Railway Company (JR West).

== Lines ==
Nonokuchi Station is served by the Tsuyama Line, and is located 16.7 kilometers from the southern terminus of the line at Okayama.

== Station layout ==
The station consists of two ground-level opposed side platforms connected by a level crossing. The station is unattended.

=== Platforms ===
1	■ TTsuyama Line	for Fukuwatari and Tsuyama
2	■ T Tsuyama Line	for Okayama

== Adjacent stations ==
«	Service	»
JR West Tsuyama Line
Hōkaiin	Rapid Kotobuki	Kanagawa
Makiyama	Local	Kanagawa
Rapid: Does not stop at this station

== History ==
Nonokuchi Station opened on December 21, 1898 with the opening of the Tsuyama Line. With the privatization of the Japan National Railways (JNR) on April 1, 1987, the station came under the aegis of the West Japan Railway Company. The station building was rebuilt in February 2020.

== Passenger statistics ==
In fiscal 2019, the station was used by an average of 134 passengers daily.

== Surrounding area ==
- Kabaya Foods Head Office/Okayama Factory
- Okayama Municipal Mitsuminami Elementary School
- Japan National Route 53

== See also ==
- List of railway stations in Japan
