= Makiyama Station =

Railway station in Okayama, Japan

Makiyama Station 牧山駅
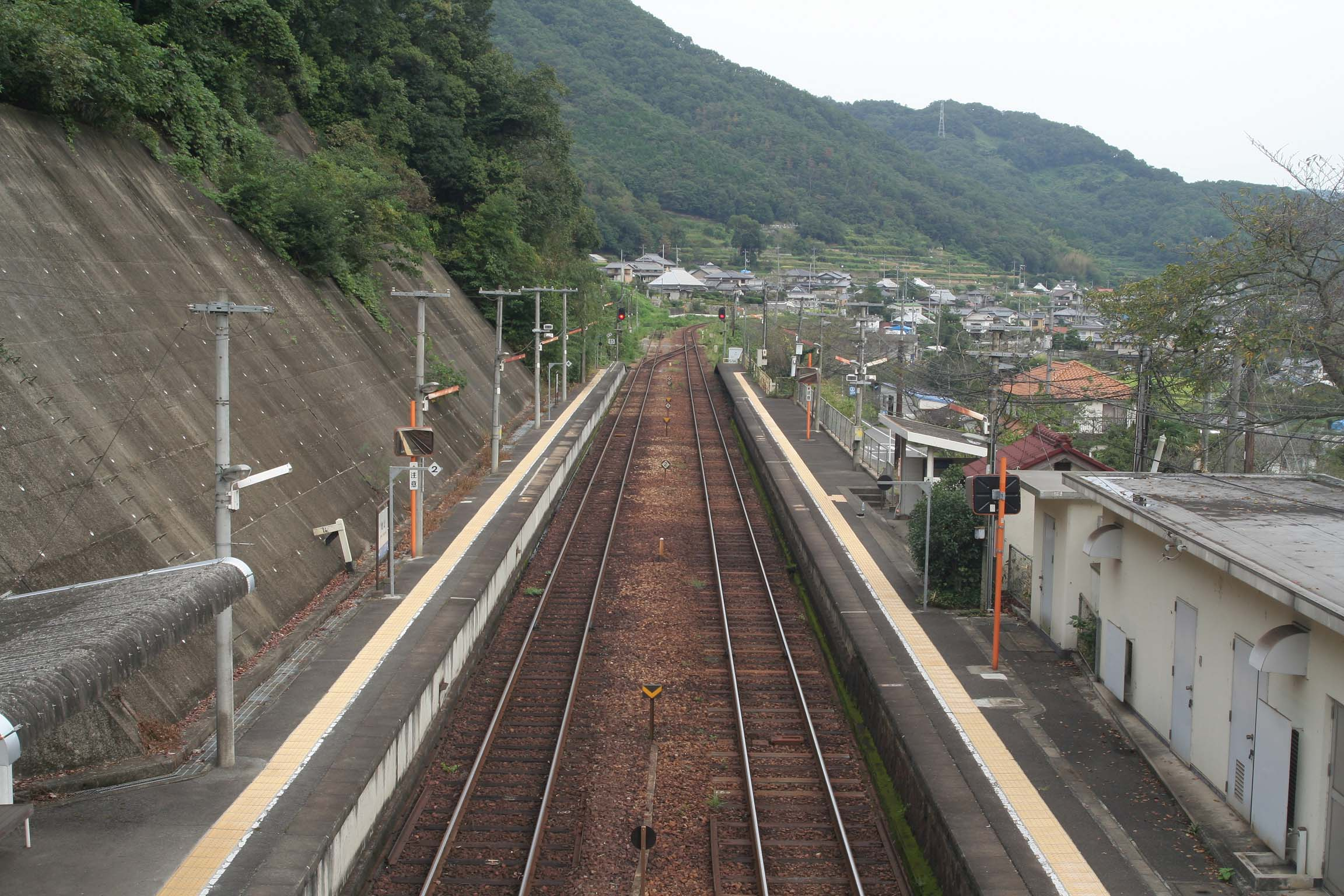
- Makiyama Station in 2007

General information
- Location: Shimomaki Kita-ku, Okayama-shi, Okayama-ken 701-2143; Japan
- Coordinates: 34°44′27.38″N 133°57′38.70″E
- Owner: West Japan Railway Company
- Operator: West Japan Railway Company
- Line: T Tsuyama Line
- Distance: 11.4 km (7.1 miles) from Okayama
- Platforms: 2 side platforms
- Connections: Bus stop

Other information
- Status: Unstaffed
- Website: Official website

History
- Opened: 10 October 1912; 114 years ago

Passengers
- FY2019: 29 daily
Location
- Location within Okayama Prefecture Location within Japan

Makiyama Station (牧山駅, Makiyama-eki) is a passenger railway station located in the Takebe-chō neighborhood of Kita-ku of the city of Okayama, Okayama Prefecture, Japan. It is operated by West Japan Railway Company (JR West).

== Lines ==
Makiyama Station is served by the Tsuyama Line, and is located 11.4 kilometers from the southern terminus of the line at Okayama.

== Station layout ==
The station consists of two ground-level opposed side platforms connected by a footbridge. The platform is narrow because the station is located along a cliff. Platform 2 is adjacent to the station building, which is little more than a waiting room. All trains normally use Platform 2 in both directions, unless trains moving in opposite directions are passing. The station is unattended.

=== Platforms ===
1	■ TTsuyama Line	for Fukuwatari and Tsuyama
2	■ T Tsuyama Line	for Okayama

== Adjacent stations ==
«	Service	»
JR West Tsuyama Line
Rapid Kotobuki: Does not stop at this station
Rapid: Does not stop at this station
Tamagashi	Local	Nonokuchi

== History ==
Makiyama Station opened on October 10, 1912. With the privatization of the Japan National Railways (JNR) on April 1, 1987, the station came under the aegis of the West Japan Railway Company.

== Passenger statistics ==
In fiscal 2019, the station was used by an average of 29 passengers daily.

== Surrounding area ==
- Makiyama Post Office
- La Porte Makiyama (Reuse of Okayama Municipal Makiishi Elementary School Makiyama Branch School, which closed in 2004)

== See also ==
- List of railway stations in Japan
