= Hōkaiin Station =

Railway station in Okayama, Japan

Hōkaiin Station 法界院駅
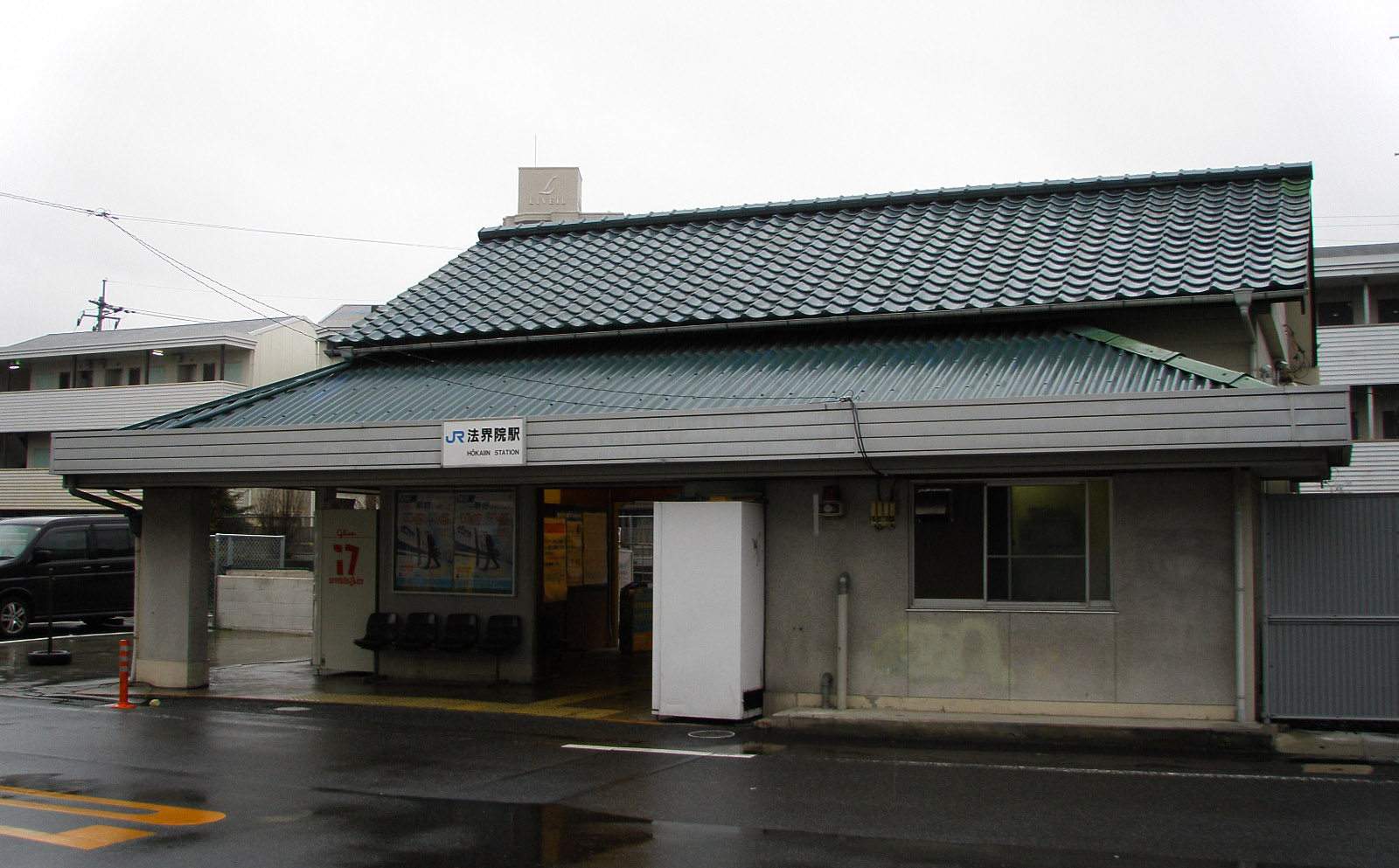
- Hōkaiin Station, April 2008

General information
- Location: 3-10 Gakunanchō, Kita-ku, Okayama-shi, Okayama-ken 700-0011; Japan
- Coordinates: 34°41′6.48″N 133°55′38.95″E
- Owner: West Japan Railway Company
- Operator: West Japan Railway Company
- Line: T Tsuyama Line
- Distance: 2.3 km (1.4 miles) from Okayama
- Platforms: 1 island platforms
- Connections: Bus stop

Other information
- Status: Unstaffed
- Website: Official website

History
- Opened: 10 June 1908; 118 years ago

Passengers
- FY2019: 1,307 daily
Location
- Location within Okayama Prefecture Location within Japan

Hōkaiin Station (法界院駅, Hōkaiin-eki) is a passenger railway station located in Kita-ku of the city of Okayama, Okayama Prefecture, Japan. It is operated by West Japan Railway Company (JR West).

== Lines ==
Hōkaiin Station is served by the Tsuyama Line, and is located 2.3 kilometers from the southern terminus of the line at Okayama.

== Station layout ==
The station consists of one ground-level island platform connected to the station building by a footbridge. The station is unattended.

=== Platforms ===
1	■ TTsuyama Line	for Fukuwatari and Tsuyama
2	■ T Tsuyama Line	for Okayama

== Adjacent stations ==
«	Service	»
JR West Tsuyama Line
Okayama	Rapid Kotobuki	Nonokuchi
Okayama	Rapid	Kanagawa
Okayama	Local	Bizen-Hara

== History ==
Hōkaiin Station opened on June 10, 1908 as a temporary stop and was upgraded to a full station on September 2 of the same year. With the privatization of the Japan National Railways (JNR) on April 1, 1987, the station came under the aegis of the West Japan Railway Company.

== Passenger statistics ==
In fiscal year 2019, the station was used by an average of 1,307 passengers daily.

== Surrounding area ==
The station is located in a dense residential area.

- Okayama Municipal Mino Elementary School
- Okayama Prefectural General Ground (City Light Stadium, Okayama Baseball Stadium, Momotaro Arena, Tsushima Ruins)
- Okayama University Tsushima Campus/The Open University of Japan Okayama Study Center
- Okayama Municipal Okakita Junior High School

== See also ==
- List of railway stations in Japan
