= Kanagawa Station (Okayama) =

Railway station in Okayama, Japan

Kanagawa Station 金川駅
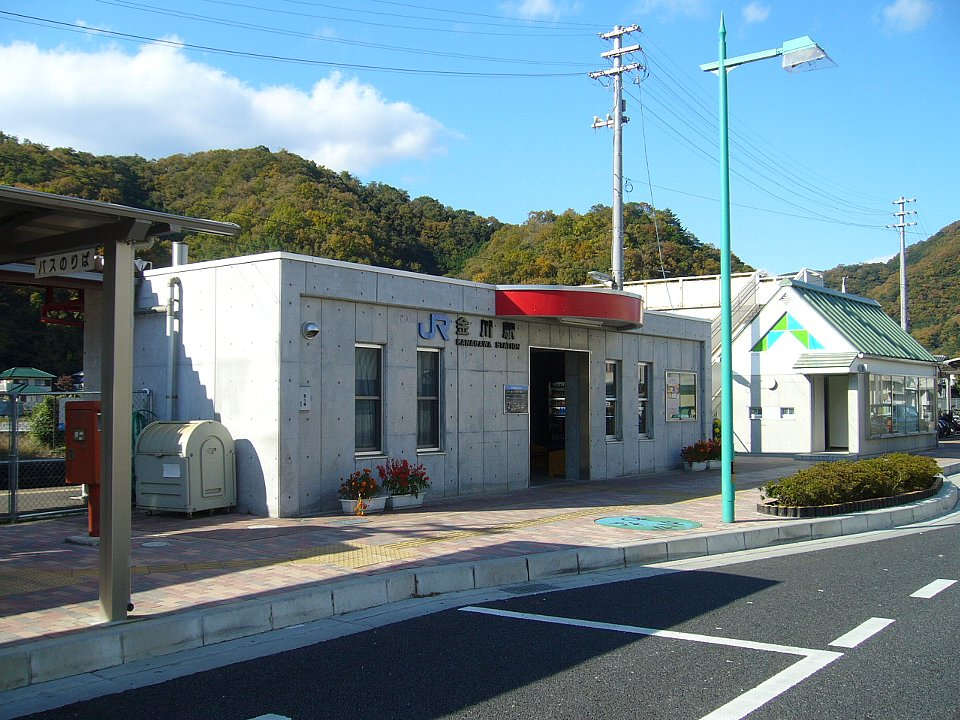
- Kanagawa Station on the Tsuyama Line, November 2006

General information
- Location: Mitsuchō Kanagawa 400, Kita-ku, Okayama-shi, Okayama-ken 709-2133; Japan
- Coordinates: 34°47′31.60″N 133°56′2.00″E
- Owner: West Japan Railway Company
- Operator: West Japan Railway Company
- Line: T Tsuyama Line
- Distance: 19.7 km (12.2 miles) from Okayama
- Platforms: 2 side platforms
- Connections: Bus stop

Other information
- Status: Unstaffed
- Website: Official website

History
- Opened: 21 December 1898; 127 years ago

Passengers
- FY2019: 816 daily
Location
- Location within Okayama Prefecture Location within Japan

Kanagawa Station (金川駅, Kanagawa-eki) is a passenger railway station located in the Takebe-chō neighborhood of Kita-ku of the city of Okayama, Okayama Prefecture, Japan. It is operated by West Japan Railway Company (JR West).

== Lines ==
Kanagawa Station is served by the Tsuyama Line, and is located 19.7 kilometers from the southern terminus of the line at Okayama.

== Station layout ==
The station consists of two ground-level opposed side platforms connected by a footbridge. There used to be a large wooden station building built at the time of its opening, which was relatively well maintained, but on February 1, 2005, it was rebuilt into a concrete building on the occasion of the Okayama National Athletic Meet. At that time, the position of the station building moved about 40 meters toward Okayama. Platform 2 is adjacent to the station building and there is a rain shelter on Platform 1.The station is unattended.

=== Platforms ===
| 1 | ■ TTsuyama Line | for Fukuwatari and Tsuyama |
| 2 | ■ T Tsuyama Line | for Okayama |

== Adjacent stations ==
| « | Service | » |
JR West Tsuyama Line
| Nonokuchi | Rapid Kotobuki | Takebe |
| Hōkaiin | Rapid | Takebe |
| Nonokuchi | Local | Takebe |

== History ==
Kanagawa Station opened on December 21, 1898, with the opening of the Tsuyama Line. With the privatization of the Japan National Railways (JNR) on April 1, 1987, the station came under the aegis of the West Japan Railway Company.

== Passenger statistics ==
In fiscal 2019, the station was used by an average of 816 passengers daily.

== Surrounding area ==
- Okayama City Kita Ward Office Mitsu Branch (former Mitsu Town Office)
- Okayama Prefectural Okayama Mitsu High School
- Okayama Municipal Mitsu Junior High School

== See also ==
- List of railway stations in Japan
