= Tamagashi Station =

Railway station in Okayama, Japan

Tamagashi Station 玉柏駅
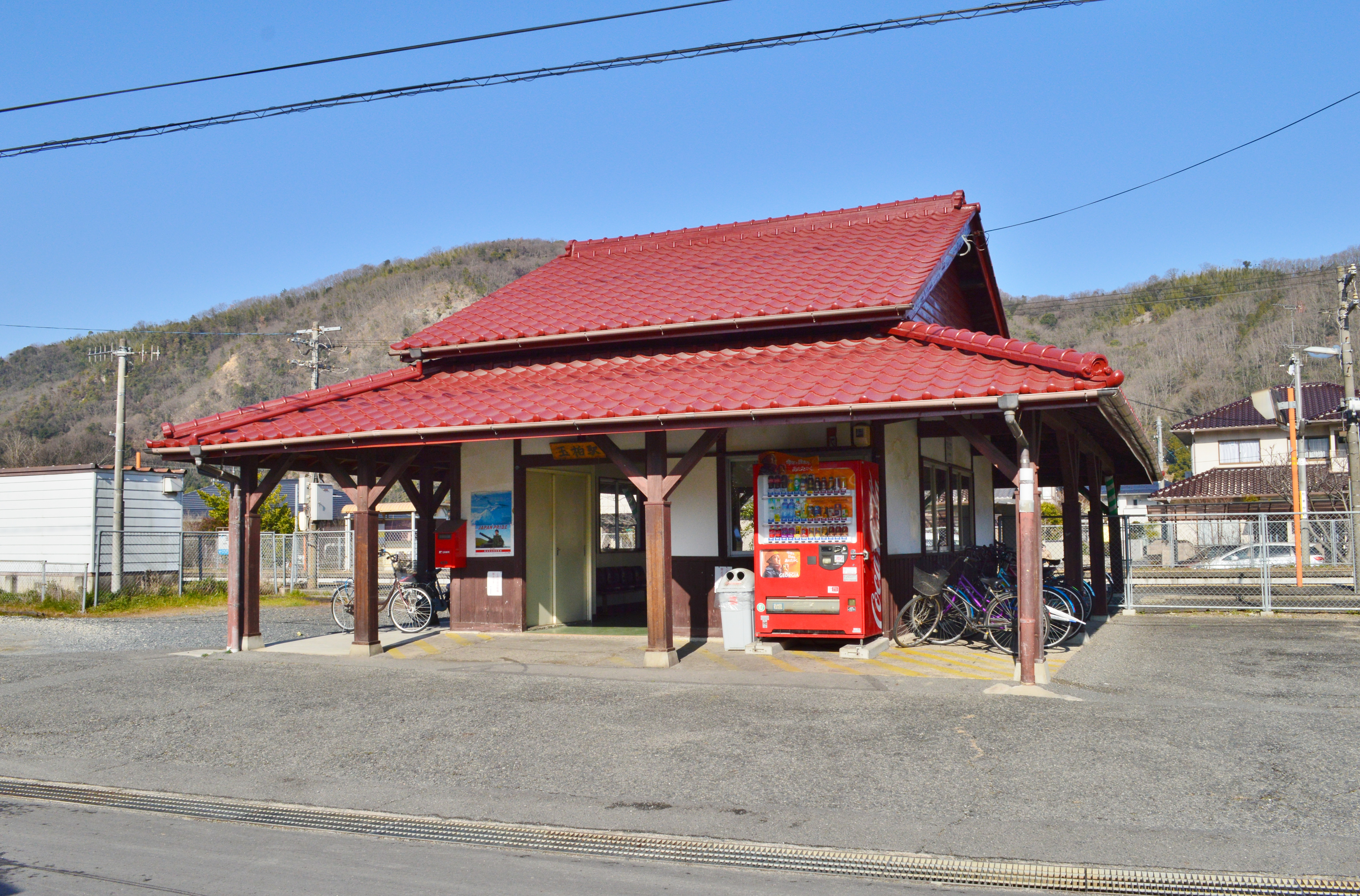
- Tamagashi Station in January 2017

General information
- Location: 1325 Tamagashi, Kita-ku, Okayama-shi, Okayama-ken 701-2142; Japan
- Coordinates: 34°43′0.73″N 133°57′52.55″E
- Owner: West Japan Railway Company
- Operator: West Japan Railway Company
- Line: T Tsuyama Line
- Distance: 7.5 km (4.7 miles) from Okayama
- Platforms: 2 side platforms
- Connections: Bus stop

Other information
- Status: Unstaffed
- Website: Official website

History
- Opened: 21 December 1898; 127 years ago

Passengers
- FY2019: 98 daily
Location
- Location within Okayama Prefecture Location within Japan

Tamagashi Station (玉柏駅, Tamagashi-eki) is a passenger railway station located in Kita-ku of the city of Okayama, Okayama Prefecture, Japan. It is operated by West Japan Railway Company (JR West).

== Lines ==
Tamagashi Station is served by the Tsuyama Line, and is located 7.5 kilometers from the southern terminus of the line at Okayama.

== Station layout ==
The station consists of two ground-level opposed side platforms connected by a level crossing. There used to be a large wooden station building built at the time of its opening, which was relatively well maintained, but the station office was demolished and the waiting room was rebuilt to about half the size. The station is unattended.

=== Platforms ===
| 1 | ■ TTsuyama Line | for Fukuwatari and Tsuyama |
| 2 | ■ T Tsuyama Line | for Okayama |

== Adjacent stations ==
| « | Service | » |
JR West Tsuyama Line
Rapid Kotobuki: Does not stop at this station
| Bizen-Hara | Local | Makiyama |

== History ==
The station opened on 21 December 1898. With the privatization of Japanese National Railways (JNR) on 1 April 1987, the station came under the control of JR West.

== Passenger statistics ==
In fiscal 2019, the station was used by an average of 98 passengers daily.

== Surrounding area ==
- Asahi River
- Okayama Prefectural Road No. 27 Okayama Yoshii Line
- Okayama Prefectural Road No. 218 Tamahashi Nonokuchi Line
- Okayama Prison

== See also ==
- List of railway stations in Japan
