= Kamenokō Station =

Railway station in Misaki, Okayama Prefecture, Japan

Kamenokō Station 亀甲駅
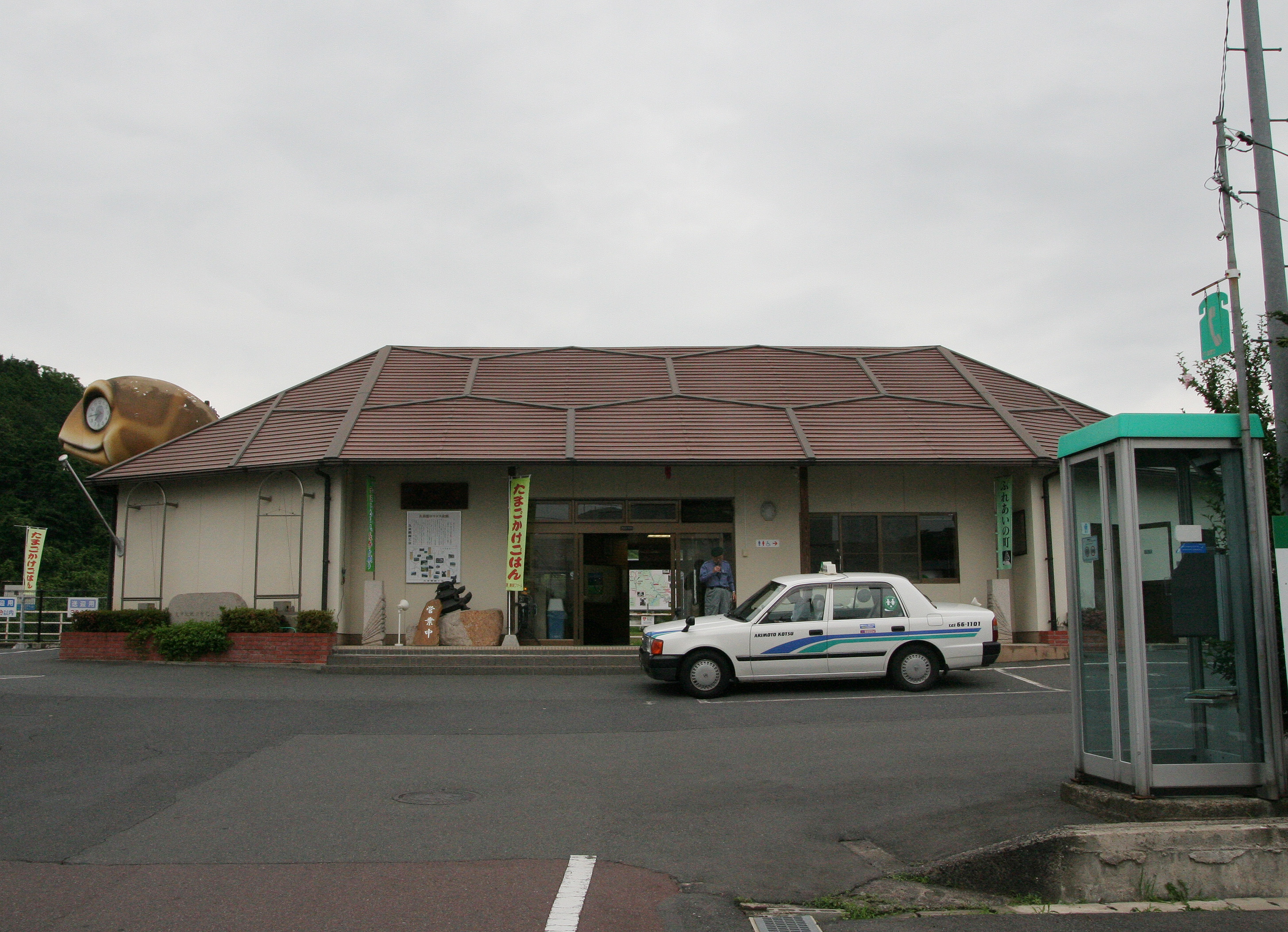
- Kamenokō Station, June 2008

General information
- Location: 1757 Harada, Misaki-cho, Kume-gun, Okayama-ken 709-3717; Japan
- Coordinates: 34°59′55.49″N 133°57′32.68″E
- Owner: West Japan Railway Company
- Operator: West Japan Railway Company
- Line: T Tsuyama Line
- Distance: 45.5 km (28.3 miles) from Okayama
- Platforms: 2 side platforms
- Connections: Bus stop

Other information
- Status: Staffed
- Website: Official website

History
- Opened: 21 December 1898; 127 years ago

Passengers
- FY2019: 224 daily
Location
- Location within Okayama Prefecture Location within Japan

Kamenokō Station (亀甲駅, Kamenokō-eki) is a passenger railway station located in the town of Misaki, Kume District, Okayama Prefecture, Japan, operated by West Japan Railway Company (JR West).

== Lines ==
Kamenokō Station is served by the Tsuyama Line, and is located 49.1 kilometers from the southern terminus of the line at Okayama.

== Station layout ==
The station consists of two opposed ground-level side platforms connected by a footbridge. The wooden station building is located adjacent to Platform 1, which is the main platform and serves trains in both directions. The station is staffed. The octagonal station building as a turtle motif, with a turtle head installed on the roof, and clocks in the place of eyes. In addition to the waiting room, there are restaurants and a library in the station building.

=== Platforms ===
1	■ TTsuyama Line	for Tsuyama for Fukuwatari, Okayama
2	■ T Tsuyama Line	for Fukuwatari, Okayama

== Adjacent stations ==
«	Service	»
JR West Tsuyama Line
Yuge	Rapid Kotobuki	Tsuyama
Obara	Rapid	Sarayama
Obara	Local	Sarayama

== History ==
Kamenokō Station opened on December 21, 1898. With the privatization of the Japan National Railways (JNR) on April 1, 1987, the station came under the aegis of the West Japan Railway Company The current station building was completed in 1995.

== Passenger statistics ==
In fiscal 2019, the station was used by an average of 224 passengers daily.

== Surrounding area ==
- Misaki Town Hall
- Japan National Route 53.

== See also ==
- List of railway stations in Japan
