= Yuge Station =

Railway station in Kumenan, Okayama Prefecture, Japan

Yuge Station 弓削駅
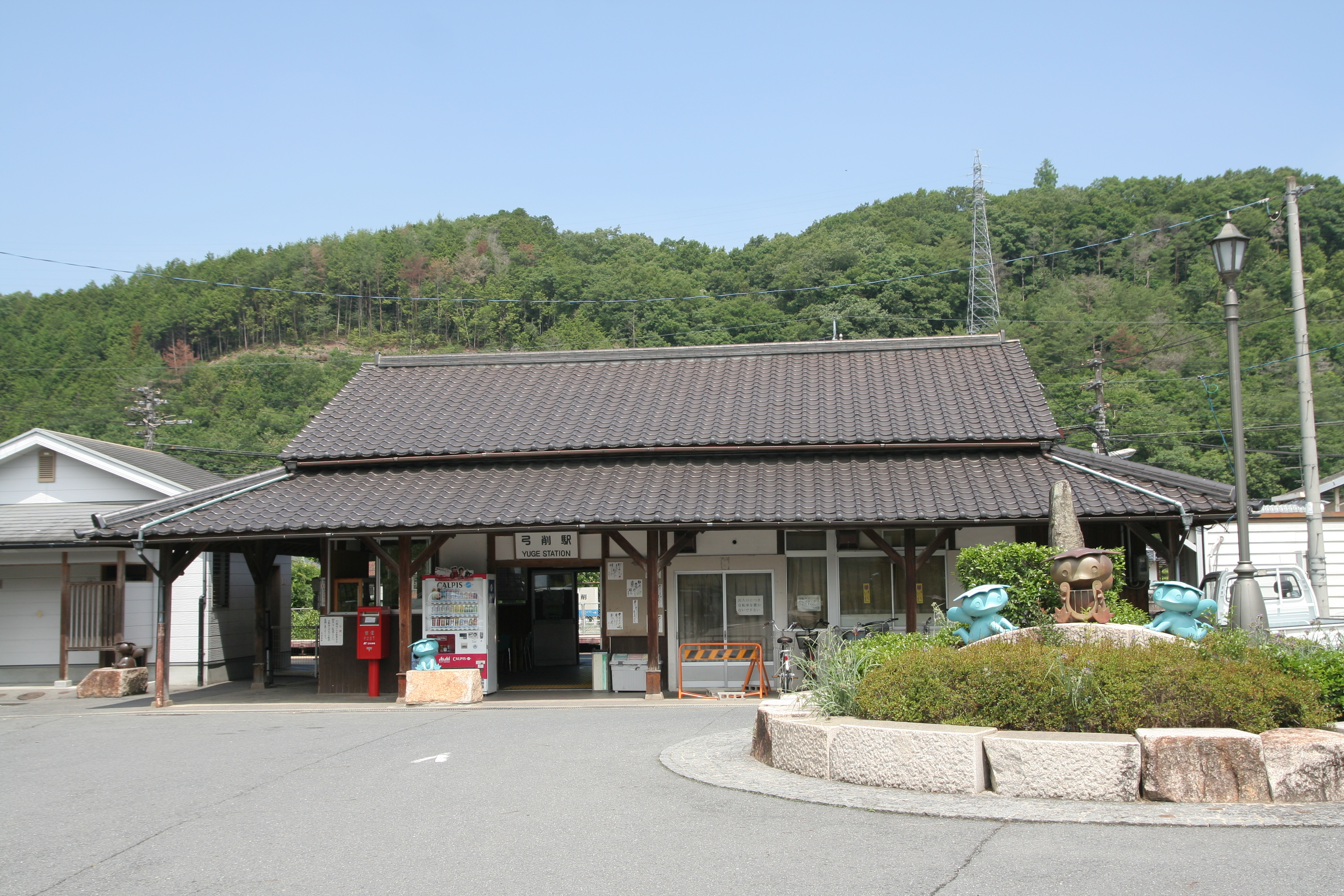
- Yuge Station, June 2009

General information
- Location: Shimoyuge, Kumenan-cho, Kume-gun, Okayama-ken 709-3614; Japan
- Coordinates: 34°55′31.83″N 133°57′28.22″E
- Owner: West Japan Railway Company
- Operator: West Japan Railway Company
- Line: T Tsuyama Line
- Distance: 40.5 km (25.2 miles) from Okayama
- Platforms: 2 side platforms
- Connections: Bus stop

Other information
- Status: Staffed
- Website: Official website

History
- Opened: 21 December 1898; 127 years ago

Passengers
- FY2019: 196 daily
Location
- Location within Okayama Prefecture Location within Japan

Yuge Station (弓削駅, Yuge-eki) is a passenger railway station located in the town of Kumenan, Kume District, Okayama Prefecture, Japan, operated by West Japan Railway Company (JR West).

== Lines ==
Yuge Station is served by the Tsuyama Line, and is located 40.5 kilometers from the southern terminus of the line at Okayama.

== Station layout ==
The station consists of two ground-level opposed side platforms. The station building is owned by Kumenan Town is located on the side of Platform 2, and is connected to Platform 1 by a footbridge. The station is staffed.

=== Platforms ===
| 1 | ■ TTsuyama Line | for Tsuyama for Fukuwatari, Okayama |
| 2 | ■ T Tsuyama Line | for Fukuwatari, Okayama |

== Adjacent stations ==
| « | Service | » |
JR West Tsuyama Line
| Fukuwatari | Rapid Kotobuki | Kamenokō |
| Kōme | Rapid | Tanjōji |
| Kōme | Local | Tanjōji |

== History ==
Yuge Station opened on December 21, 1898 with the opening of the Tsuyama Line. With the privatization of the Japan National Railways (JNR) on April 1, 1987, the station came under the aegis of the West Japan Railway Company.

== Passenger statistics ==
In fiscal 2019, the station was used by an average of 196 passengers daily.

== Surrounding area ==
- Kumenan Town Hall
- Kumenan Municipal Kumenan Junior High School
- Japan National Route 53.

== See also ==
- List of railway stations in Japan
