= Tanjōji Station =

Railway station in Kumenan, Okayama Prefecture, Japan

Tanjōji Station 誕生寺駅
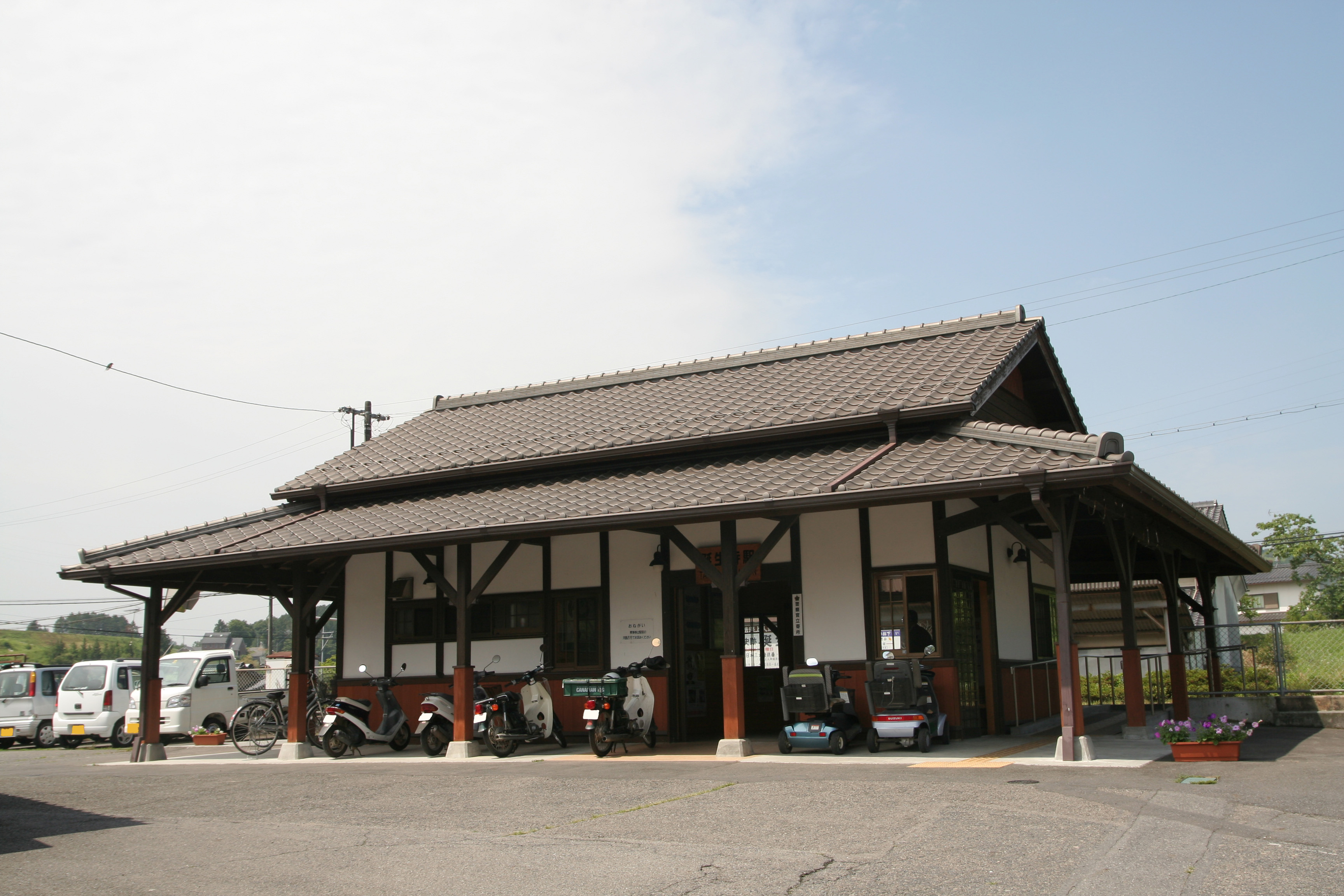
- Tanjōji Station, June 2009

General information
- Location: Satogata, Kumenan-cho, Kume-gun, Okayama-ken 709-3602; Japan
- Coordinates: 34°57′5.28″N 133°57′34.02″E
- Owner: West Japan Railway Company
- Operator: West Japan Railway Company
- Line: T Tsuyama Line
- Distance: 43.5 km (27.0 miles) from Okayama
- Platforms: 1 side platform
- Connections: Bus stop

Other information
- Status: Staffed
- Website: Official website

History
- Opened: 21 December 1898; 127 years ago

Passengers
- FY2019: 47 daily
Location
- Location within Okayama Prefecture Location within Japan

Tanjōji Station (誕生寺駅, Tanjōji-eki) is a passenger railway station located in the town of Kumenan, Kume District, Okayama Prefecture, Japan, operated by West Japan Railway Company (JR West).

== Lines ==
Tanjōji Station is served by the Tsuyama Line, and is located 43.5 kilometers from the southern terminus of the line at Okayama.

== Station layout ==
The station consists of one ground-level side platform serving a single bi-directional track. The wooden station building dates to the foundation of the station in 1898. The station is unattended.

== Adjacent stations ==
«	Service	»
JR West Tsuyama Line
Rapid Kotobuki: Does not stop at this station
Yuge	Rapid	Obara
Yuge	Local	Obara

== History ==
Tanjōji Station opened on December 21, 1898. With the privatization of the Japan National Railways (JNR) on April 1, 1987, the station came under the aegis of the West Japan Railway Company.

== Passenger statistics ==
In fiscal 2019, the station was used by an average of 47 passengers daily.

== Surrounding area ==
- Tanjō-ji Temple
- Okayama Prefectural Tanjoji Support School
- Japan National Route 53.

== See also ==
- List of railway stations in Japan
