= Obara Station =

Railway station in Misaki, Okayama Prefecture, Japan

Obara Station 小原駅
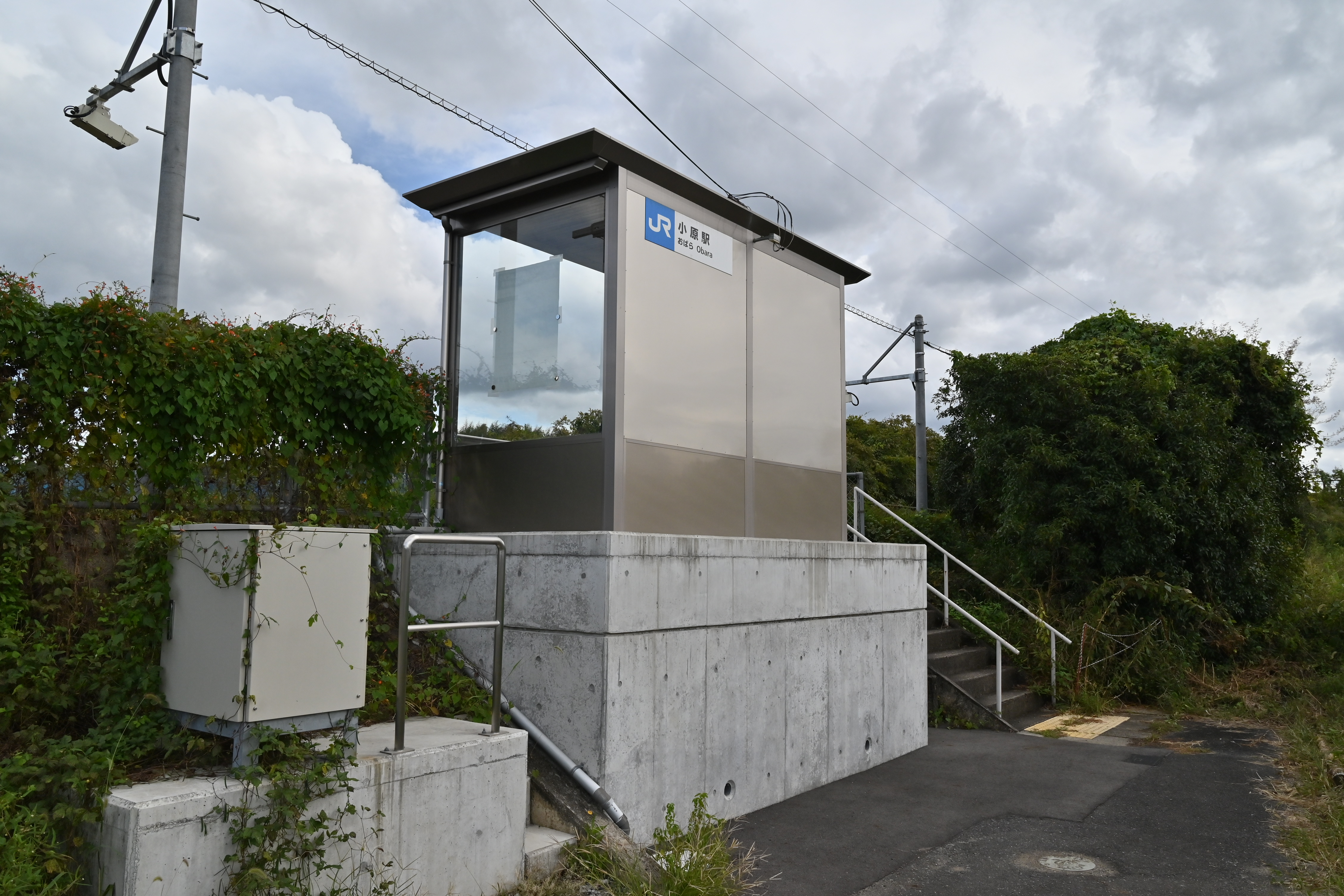
- Obara Station, October 2022

General information
- Location: Obara, Misaki-cho, Kume-gun, Okayama-ken 709-3714; Japan
- Coordinates: 34°58′5.81″N 133°57′43.34″E
- Owner: West Japan Railway Company
- Operator: West Japan Railway Company
- Line: T Tsuyama Line
- Distance: 45.5 km (28.3 miles) from Okayama
- Platforms: 1 side platform
- Connections: Bus stop

Other information
- Status: Unstaffed
- Website: Official website

History
- Opened: 1 October 1956; 69 years ago

Passengers
- FY2019: 32 daily
Location
- Location within Okayama Prefecture Location within Japan

Obara Station (小原駅, Obara-eki) is a passenger railway station located in the town of Misaki, Kume District, Okayama Prefecture, Japan, operated by West Japan Railway Company (JR West).

== Lines ==
Obara Station is served by the Tsuyama Line, and is located 45.5 kilometers from the southern terminus of the line at Okayama.

== Station layout ==
The station consists of one ground-level side platform serving a single bi-directional track. The station is unattended.

== Adjacent stations ==
«	Service	»
JR West Tsuyama Line
Rapid Kotobuki: Does not stop at this station
Rapid: Does not stop at this station
Tanjōji	Local	Kamenokō

== History ==
Obara Station opened on October 1, 1956. With the privatization of the Japan National Railways (JNR) on April 1, 1987, the station came under the aegis of the West Japan Railway Company. A new glassed-in rain shelter on the platform was completed in March 2020. There is no station building and the station is unattended.

== Passenger statistics ==
In fiscal 2019, the station was used by an average of 32 passengers daily.

== Surrounding area ==
The surrounding area is surrounded by large fields, but there are private houses here and there. The area around the station runs parallel to Japan National Route 53.

== See also ==
- List of railway stations in Japan
