= Takebe Station =

Railway station in Okayama, Japan

Takebe Station 建部駅
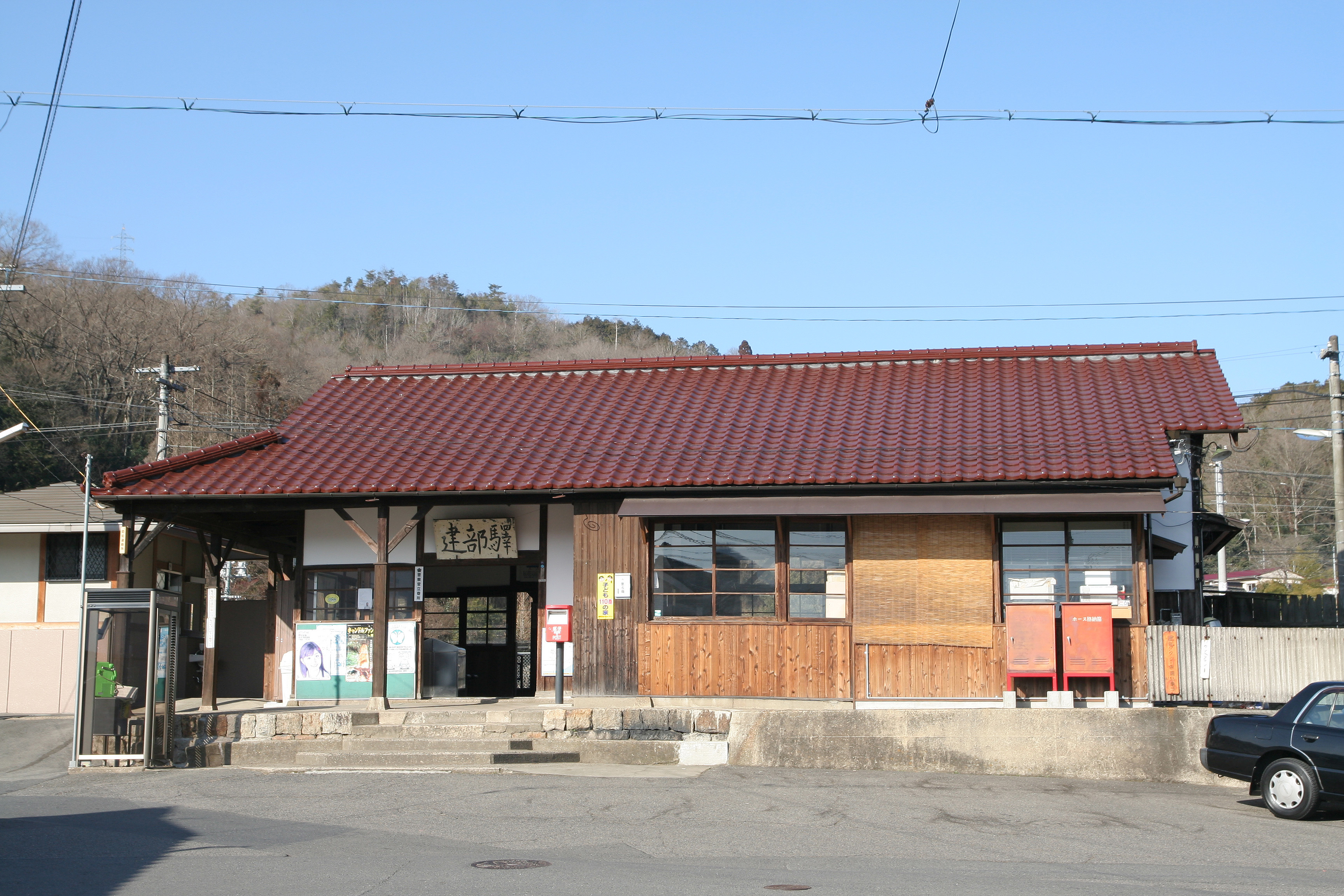
- Takebe Station, January 2009

General information
- Location: Takebechō Nakada 518, Kita-ku, Okayama-shi, Okayama-ken 709-3132; Japan
- Coordinates: 34°50′32.15″N 133°53′57.22″E
- Owner: West Japan Railway Company
- Operator: West Japan Railway Company
- Line: T Tsuyama Line
- Distance: 27.0 km (16.8 miles) from Okayama
- Platforms: 2 side platforms
- Connections: Bus stop

Other information
- Status: Unstaffed
- Website: Official website

History
- Opened: 14 April 1900; 126 years ago

Passengers
- FY2019: 184 daily
Location
- Location within Okayama Prefecture Location within Japan

Takebe Station (建部駅, Takebe-eki) is a passenger railway station located in the Takebe-chō neighborhood of Kita-ku of the city of Okayama, Okayama Prefecture, Japan. It is operated by West Japan Railway Company (JR West).

== Lines ==
Takebe Station is served by the Tsuyama Line, and is located 27.0 kilometers from the southern terminus of the line at Okayama.

== Station layout ==
The station consists of two opposed ground-level side platforms connected by a level crossing. The wooden station building is located on the side of Platform 2, And a waiting room is located on Platform 1. The station is unattended. The station building received protection by the national government as a Registered Tangible Cultural Property in 2006.

=== Platforms ===
1	■ TTsuyama Line	for Fukuwatari and Tsuyama
2	■ T Tsuyama Line	for Okayama

== Adjacent stations ==
«	Service	»
JR West Tsuyama Line
Kanagawa	Rapid Kotobuki	Fukuwatari
Kanagawa	Rapid	Fukuwatari
Kanagawa	Local	Fukuwatari

== History ==
Takebe Station opened on April 14, 1900, with donations collected by local citizens' movement to open a new station. The station was used as the setting for the 1998 Japanese Comedy-drama film Dr. Akagi by director Shohei Imamura. With the privatization of the Japan National Railways (JNR) on April 1, 1987, the station came under the aegis of the West Japan Railway Company.

== Passenger statistics ==
In fiscal 2019, the station was used by an average of 184 passengers daily.

== Surrounding area ==
- Okayama Municipal Takebe Junior High School
- Okayama Municipal Takebe Nursery School
- Takebe Town Cultural Center

== See also ==
- List of railway stations in Japan
