= Bizen-Hara Station =

Railway station in Okayama, Japan

Bizen-Hara Station 備前原駅
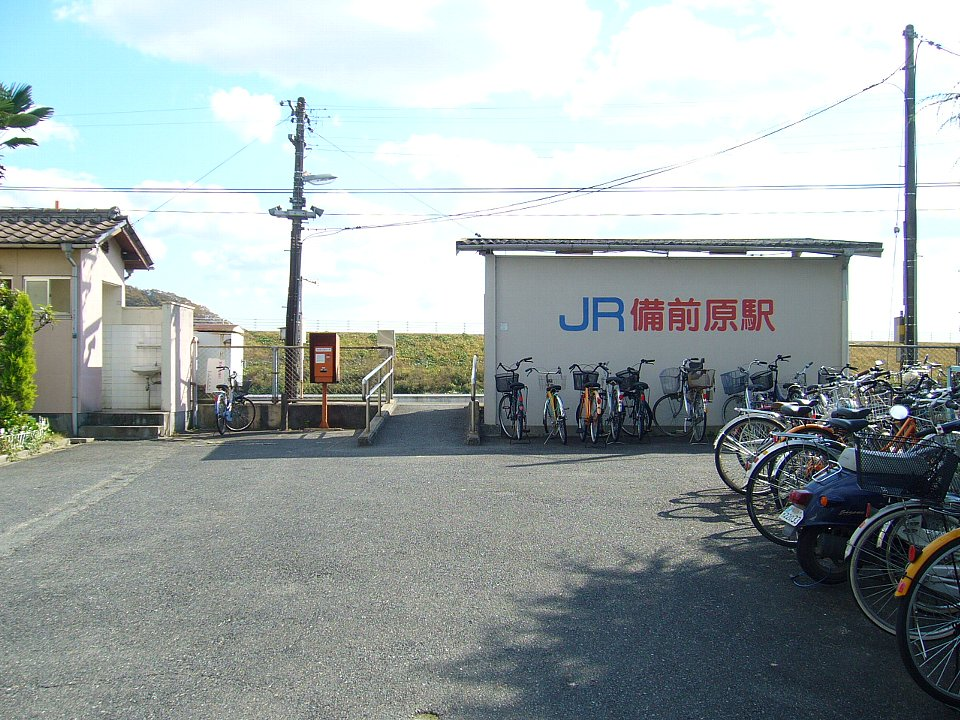
- Bizen-Hara Station, November 2006

General information
- Location: Hara, Kita-ku, Okayama-shi, Okayama-ken 701-2154; Japan
- Coordinates: 34°42′17.92″N 133°56′41.62″E
- Owner: West Japan Railway Company
- Operator: West Japan Railway Company
- Line: T Tsuyama Line
- Distance: 5.1 km (3.2 miles) from Okayama
- Platforms: 1 side platform
- Connections: Bus stop

Other information
- Status: Unstaffed
- Website: Official website

History
- Opened: 1 April 1927; 99 years ago

Passengers
- FY2019: 98 daily
Location
- Location within Okayama Prefecture Location within Japan

Bizen-Hara Station (備前原駅, Bizen-Hara-eki) is a passenger railway station located in the Takebe-chō neighborhood of Kita-ku of the city of Okayama, Okayama Prefecture, Japan. It is operated by West Japan Railway Company (JR West).

== Lines ==
Bizen-Hara Station is served by the Tsuyama Line, and is located 5.1 kilometers from the southern terminus of the line at Okayama.

== Station layout ==
The station consists of one ground-level side platform serving single bi-directional track. There is a simple station building which serves as a waiting room. The station is unattended.

== Adjacent stations ==
«	Service	»
JR West Tsuyama Line
Rapid Kotobuki: Does not stop at this station
Rapid: Does not stop at this station
Hōkaiin	Local	Tamagashi

== History ==
Bizen-Hara Station opened as a temporary station on April 1, 1927 and was closed on October 1 of the same year. it reopened on February 20, 1928 and was upgraded to a full passenger station on June 20, 1929. With the privatization of the Japan National Railways (JNR) on April 1, 1987, the station came under the aegis of the West Japan Railway Company.

== Passenger statistics ==
In fiscal 2019, the station was used by an average of 98 passengers daily.

== Surrounding area ==
Animo Museum (Yuko Arimori Museum)

- Okayama Municipal Makiishi Elementary School

== See also ==
- List of railway stations in Japan
