= Kōme Station =

Railway station in Kumenan, Okayama Prefecture, Japan

Kōme Station 神目駅
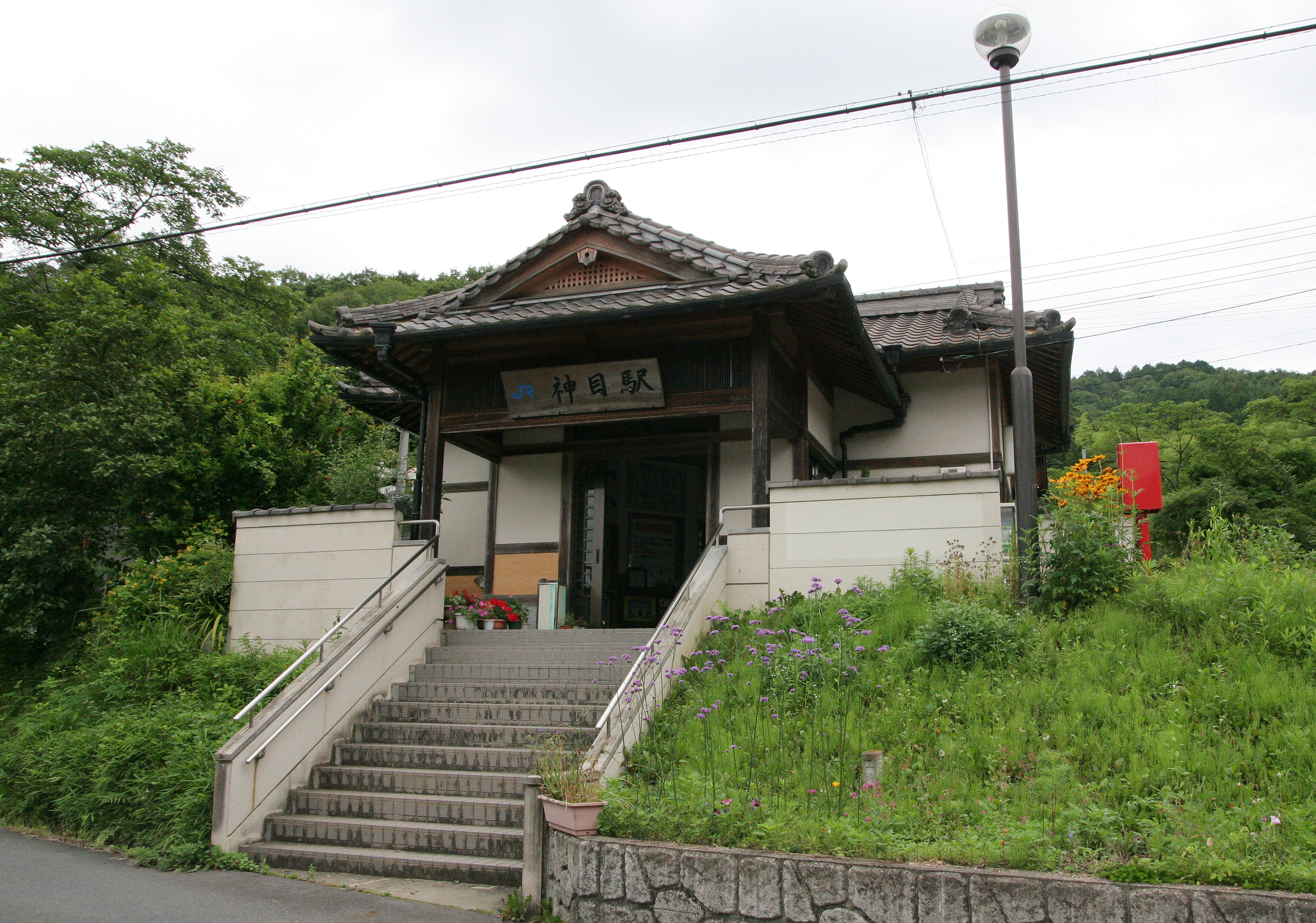
- Kōme Station, June 2009

General information
- Location: Kōmenaka, Kumenan-cho, Kume-gun, Okayama-ken 709-3627; Japan
- Coordinates: 34°53′46.21″N 133°56′6.59″E
- Owner: West Japan Railway Company
- Operator: West Japan Railway Company
- Line: T Tsuyama Line
- Distance: 36.5 km (22.7 miles) from Okayama
- Platforms: 1 side platform
- Connections: Bus stop

Other information
- Status: Unstaffed
- Website: Official website

History
- Opened: 21 December 1898; 127 years ago

Passengers
- FY2019: 65 daily
Location
- Location within Okayama Prefecture Location within Japan

Kōme Station (神目駅, Kōme-eki) is a passenger railway station located in the town of Kumenan, Kume District, Okayama Prefecture, Japan, operated by West Japan Railway Company (JR West).

== Lines ==
Kōme Station is served by the Tsuyama Line, and is located 36.5 kilometers from the southern terminus of the line at Okayama.

== Station layout ==
The station consists of one ground-level side platform serving a single bi-directional track. It formerly had a second side platform, and the unused platform is left in situ. The station building is a gable-style wooden building that was rebuilt in 1998. The station is unattended.

== Adjacent stations ==
«	Service	»
JR West Tsuyama Line
Rapid Kotobuki: Does not stop at this station
Fukuwatari	Rapid	Yuge
Fukuwatari	Local	Yuge

== History ==
Kōme Station opened on December 21, 1898 with the opening of the Tsuyama Line. With the privatization of the Japan National Railways (JNR) on April 1, 1987, the station came under the aegis of the West Japan Railway Company.

== Passenger statistics ==
In fiscal 2019, the station was used by an average of 65 passengers daily.

== Surrounding area ==
- Japan National Route 53.

== See also ==
- List of railway stations in Japan
