= Kumenan =

Kumenan 久米南町
- Town
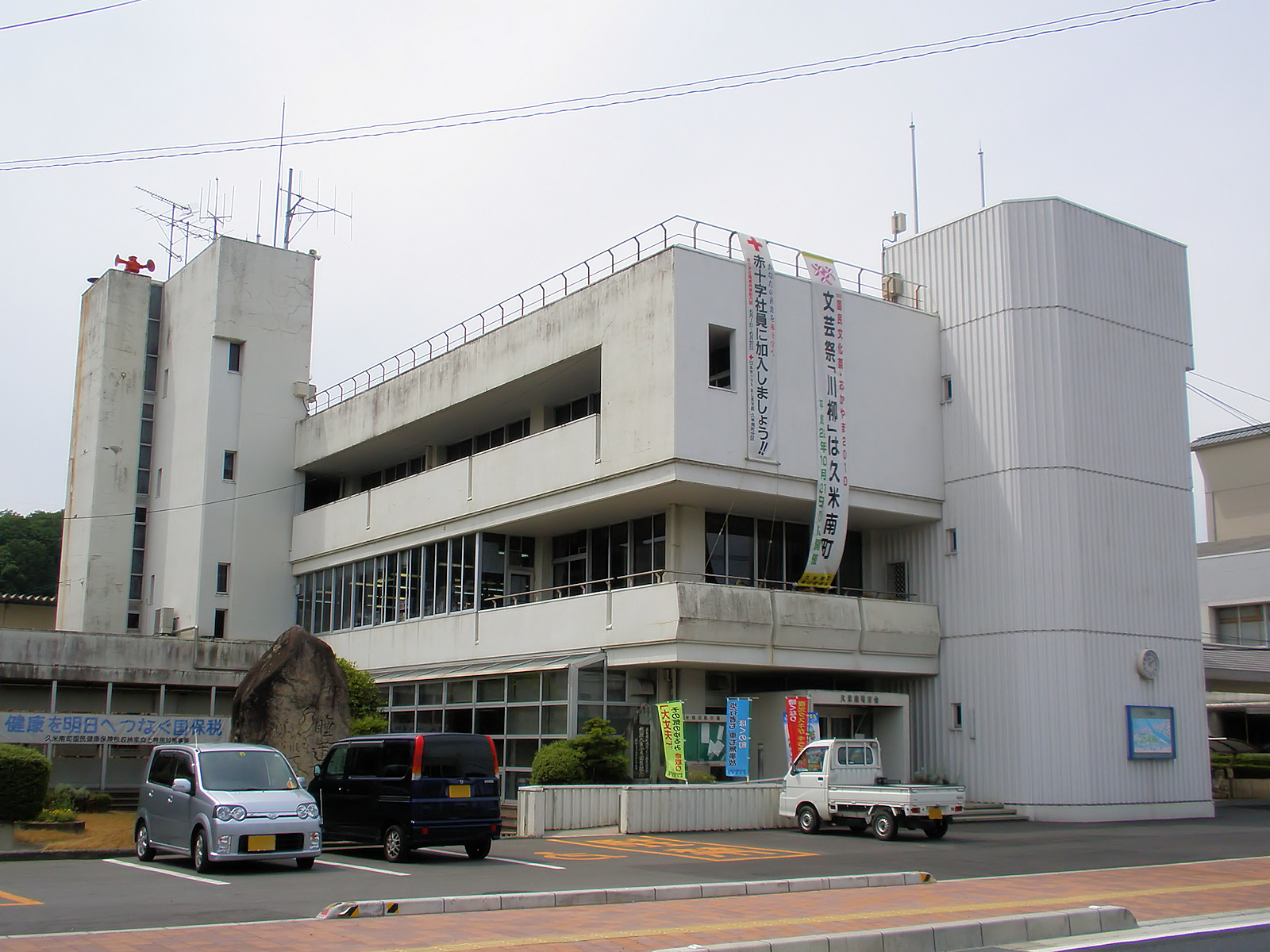
- Kumenan town hall

- Flag Chapter
- Interactive map of Kumenan
- Location in Japan
- Coordinates: 34°55′45″N 133°57′39″E
- Country: Japan
- Region: Chūgoku; San'yō
- Prefecture: Okayama
- District: Kume

Area
  - Total: 78.65 km^{2} (30.37 sq mi)

Population (January 31, 2023)
  - Total: 4,483
  - Density: 57.00/km^{2} (147.6/sq mi)
- Time zone: UTC+09:00 (JST)
- City hall address: 502-1 Shimoyuge, Kumenan-chō, Kume-gun, Okayama-ken 709-3614
- Website: Official website
- Symbols
- Flower: Rhododendron
- Tree: Ginkgo biloba

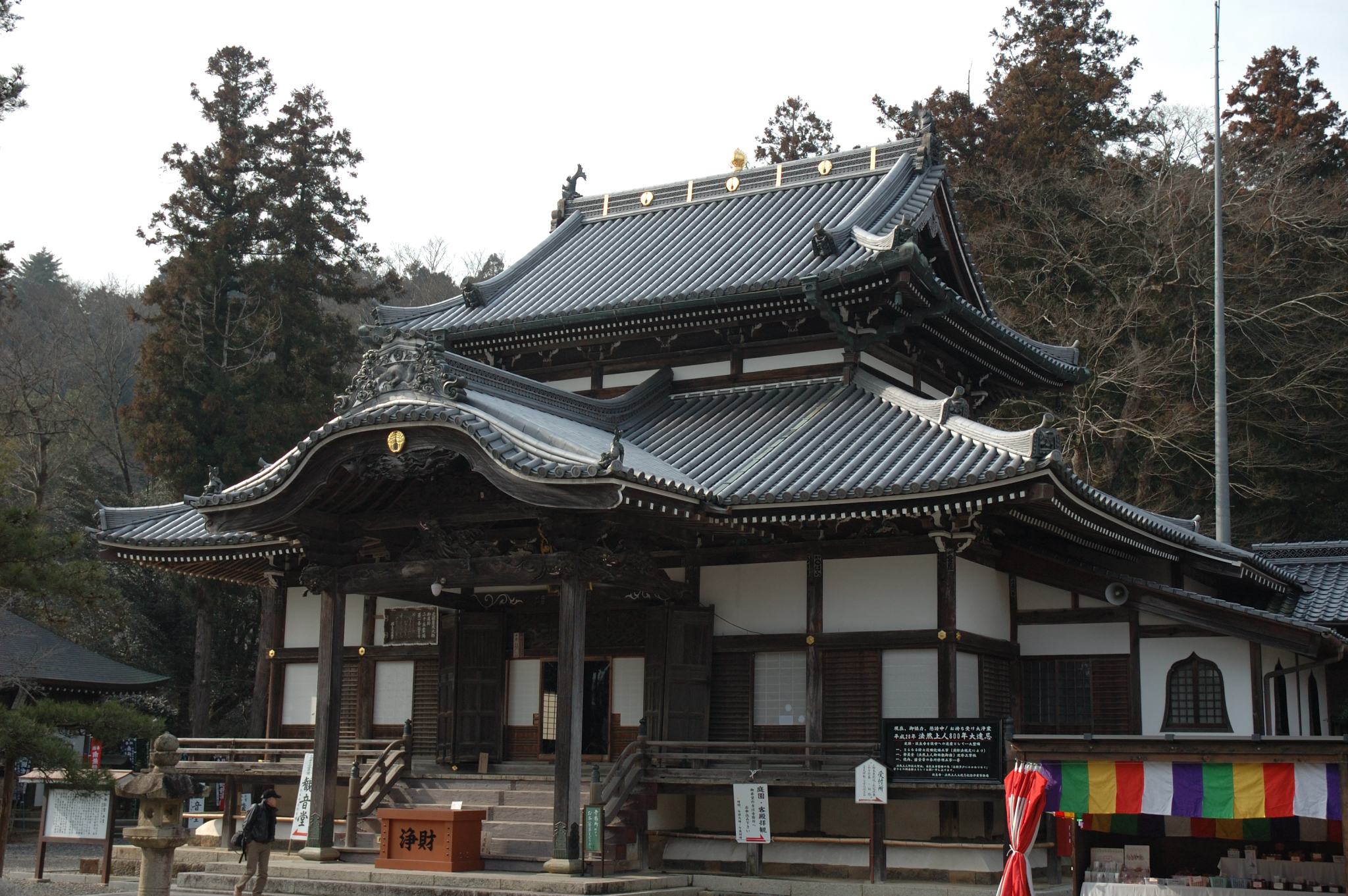
Tanjō-ji

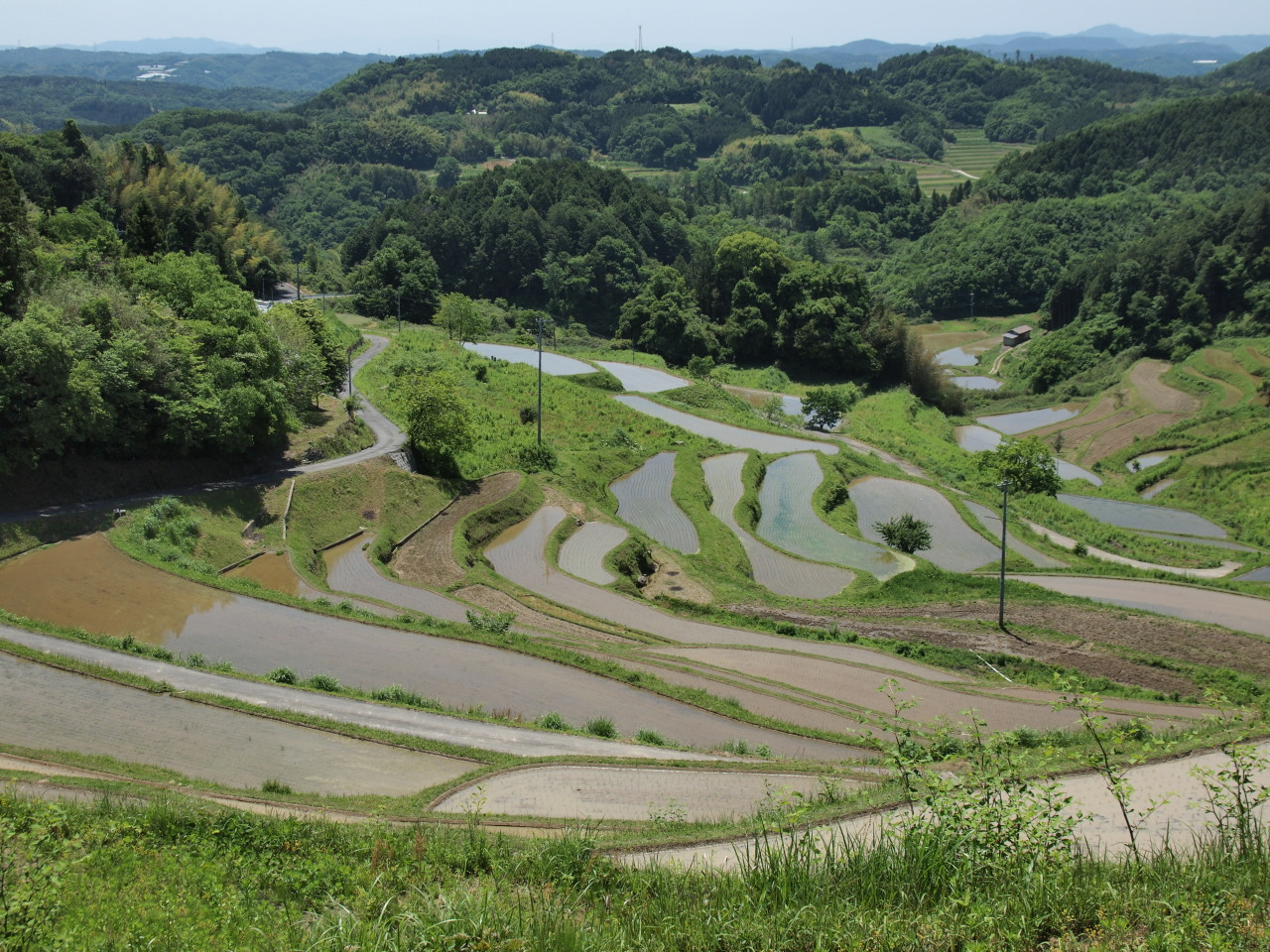
Rice terraces in Kumenan

Kumenan (久米南町, Kumenan-chō) is a town located in Kume District, Okayama Prefecture, Japan. As of 31 December 2022, the town had an estimated population of 4,483 in 2192 households and a population density of 57 persons per km^{2}. The total area of the town is 78.65 square kilometres (30.37 sq mi). Kumenan is known as the birthplace of Honen, the founder of the Jodo sect of Buddhism.

== Geography ==
Kumenan is located on the Kibi Plateau, in the east-central part of Okayama Prefecture. There are few flatlands, and most of the town is mountains, forests and plateaus.

=== Neighboring municipalities ===
Okayama Prefecture

- Akaiwa
- Misaki
- Okayama

== Climate ==
Kumenan has a humid subtropical climate (Köppen Cfa) characterized by warm summers and cool winters with moderate snowfall. The average annual temperature in Kumenan is 13.5 °C. The average annual rainfall is 1501 mm with September as the wettest month. The temperatures are highest on average in January, at around 25.5 °C, and lowest in January, at around 1.9 °C.

== Demography ==
Per Japanese census data, the population of Kumenan has been as follows. The population has been decreasing since the 1950s.

Historical population
Year	Pop.	±%
1920	8,852	—
1930	8,627	−2.5%
1940	8,097	−6.1%
1950	11,015	+36.0%
1960	10,095	−8.4%
1970	7,697	−23.8%
1980	7,257	−5.7%
1990	6,605	−9.0%
2000	6,115	−7.4%
2010	5,298	−13.4%

== History ==
The area of Kumenan was part of ancient Mimasaka Province. The village of Yuge was established with the creation of the modern municipalities system on June 1, 1889. It was raised to town status on April 1, 1917. Yuge annexed the neighboring village of Takigawa on April 1, 1940. On April 1, 1954, Yuge merged with the villages of Kōme, Tatsuyama, and Tanjōji to form the town of Kumenan.

== Government ==
Yuge has a mayor-council form of government with a directly elected mayor and a unicameral town council of eight members. Kumenan, collectively with the town of Misaki, contributes one member to the Okayama Prefectural Assembly. In terms of national politics, the town is part of the Okayama 3rd district of the lower house of the Diet of Japan.

== Economy ==
The main industry in the area is agriculture. The main crops are rice, fruit trees such as pears and grapes, leaf tobacco, and poultry farming.

== Education ==
Kumenan has three public elementary schools and one public junior high school operated by the town government. The town does not have a high school. Okayama Prefecture operates one special education school for the handicapped.

== Transportation ==
=== Railway ===
JR West (JR West) - Tsuyama Line

- Kōme - Yuge - Tanjōji

=== Highways ===
- National Route 53

== Local attractions ==
- Tanjō-ji, Buddhist temple

== Noted people from Kumenan ==
- Sen Katayama, early Japanese Marxist political activist and journalist, co-founder of the Japanese Communist Party.
