= Tsuyama Line =

Railway line in Okayama Prefecture, Japan

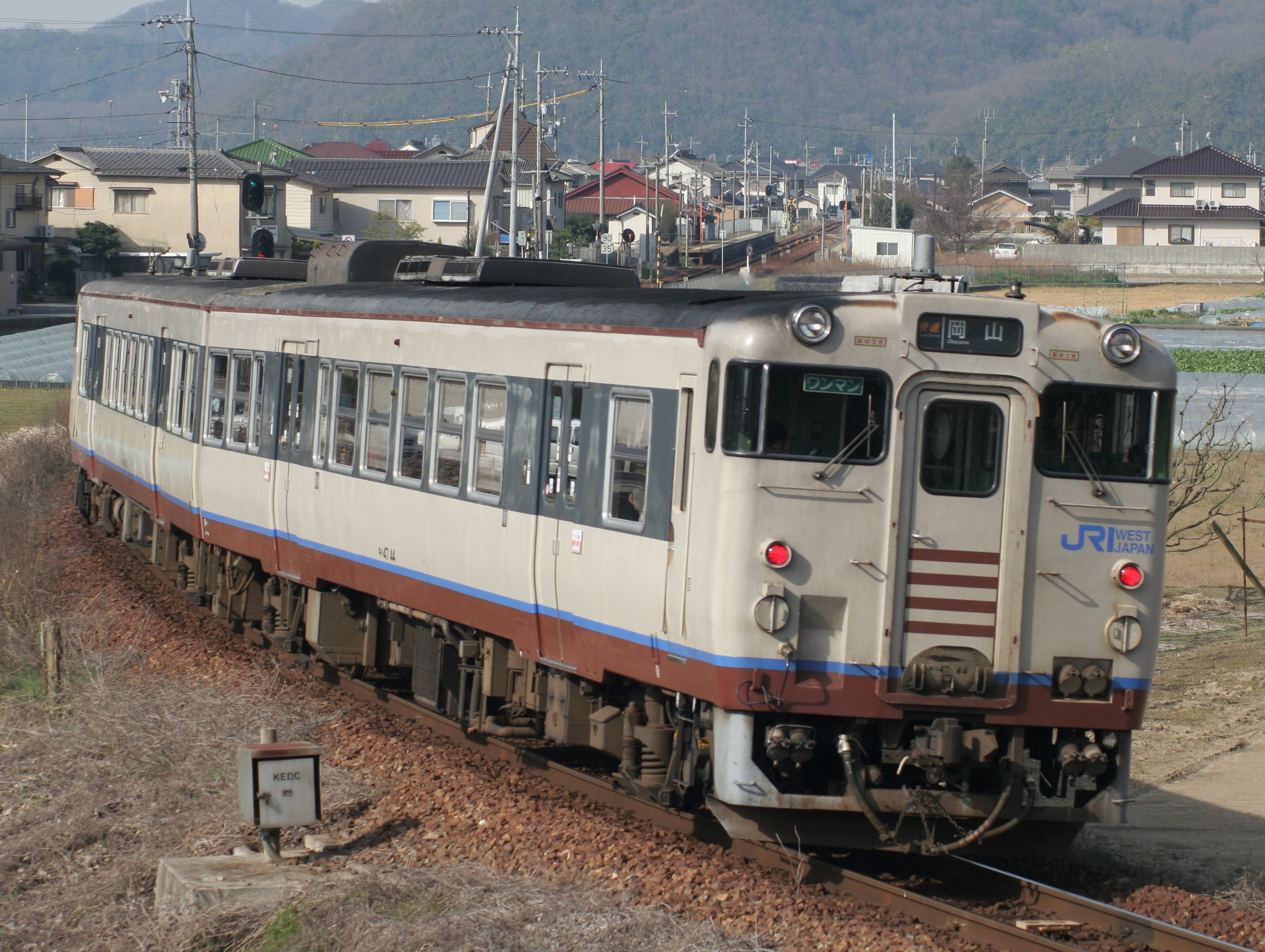
- A KiHa 47 DMU train on a Rapid service, March 2010

Overview
- Native name: 津山線
- Status: In operation
- Owner: JR West
- Locale: Okayama Prefecture
- Termini: Okayama; Tsuyama
- Stations: 17

Service
- Type: Regional rail
- Operator(s): JR West
- Rolling stock: KiHa 40 series DMU, KiHa 120 series DMU

History
- Opened: 21 December 1898; 127 years ago

Technical
- Line length: 58.7 km (36.5 mi)
- Number of tracks: Entire line single tracked
- Character: Commuter in some areas and rural in others
- Track gauge: 1,067 mm (3 ft 6 in)
- Electrification: None
- Operating speed: 95 km/h (59 mph)

The Tsuyama Line (津山線, Tsuyama-sen) is a railway line operated by West Japan Railway Company (JR West) connecting Okayama and Tsuyama in Okayama Prefecture, Japan.

== Stations ==
All-stations "Local" (普通, futsū) and limited-stop "Rapid" (快速, kaisoku) services called Kotobuki (ことぶき) operate over the line. In the "Rapid" column in the table below, "O" indicates stations at which "Rapid" services stop.

Station	Japanese	Distance (km)	Rapid	Connections	Location	
Okayama	岡山	0.0	O	Sanyō Shinkansen, Sanyō Main Line, Akō Line (Higashi-Okayama)- Hakubi Line (Kurashiki), Uno Line (Seto-Ōhashi Line), Kibi Line; Okayama Electric Tramway Higashiyama Line, Okayama Electric Tramway Seikibashi Line	Kita-ku, Okayama	Okayama
Hōkaiin	法界院	2.3	O		Kita-ku, Okayama	Okayama
Bizen-Hara	備前原	5.1			Kita-ku, Okayama	Okayama
Tamagashi	玉柏	7.5			Kita-ku, Okayama	Okayama
Makiyama	牧山	11.4			Kita-ku, Okayama	Okayama
Nonokuchi	野々口	16.7			Kita-ku, Okayama	Okayama
Kanagawa	金川	19.7	O		Kita-ku, Okayama	Okayama
Takebe	建部	27.0			Kita-ku, Okayama	Okayama
Fukuwatari	福渡	30.3	O		Kita-ku, Okayama	Okayama
Kōme	神目	36.5			Kumenan, Kume District	Okayama
Yuge	弓削	40.5	O		Kumenan, Kume District	Okayama
Tanjōji	誕生寺	43.5			Kumenan, Kume District	Okayama
Obara	小原	45.5			Misaki; Kume District	Okayama
Kamenokō	亀甲	49.1	O		Misaki; Kume District	Okayama
Sarayama	佐良山	53.4			Tsuyama	Okayama
Tsuyamaguchi	津山口	56.8			Tsuyama	Okayama
Tsuyama	津山	58.7	O	Kishin Line, Inbi Line	Tsuyama	Okayama

Some Rapid services also stop at Nonokuchi and Takebe stations.

== History ==
The line was opened on 21 December 1898 by the Chugoku Railway (中国鉄道). It was nationalized on 1 June 1944, becoming part of the Japanese National Railways (JNR) system, and from 1 April 1987, with the privatization of JNR, it was transferred to the control of West Japan Railway Company (JR West).

== See also ==
- List of railway lines in Japan
