= Misaki, Okayama =

Misaki 美咲町
- Town
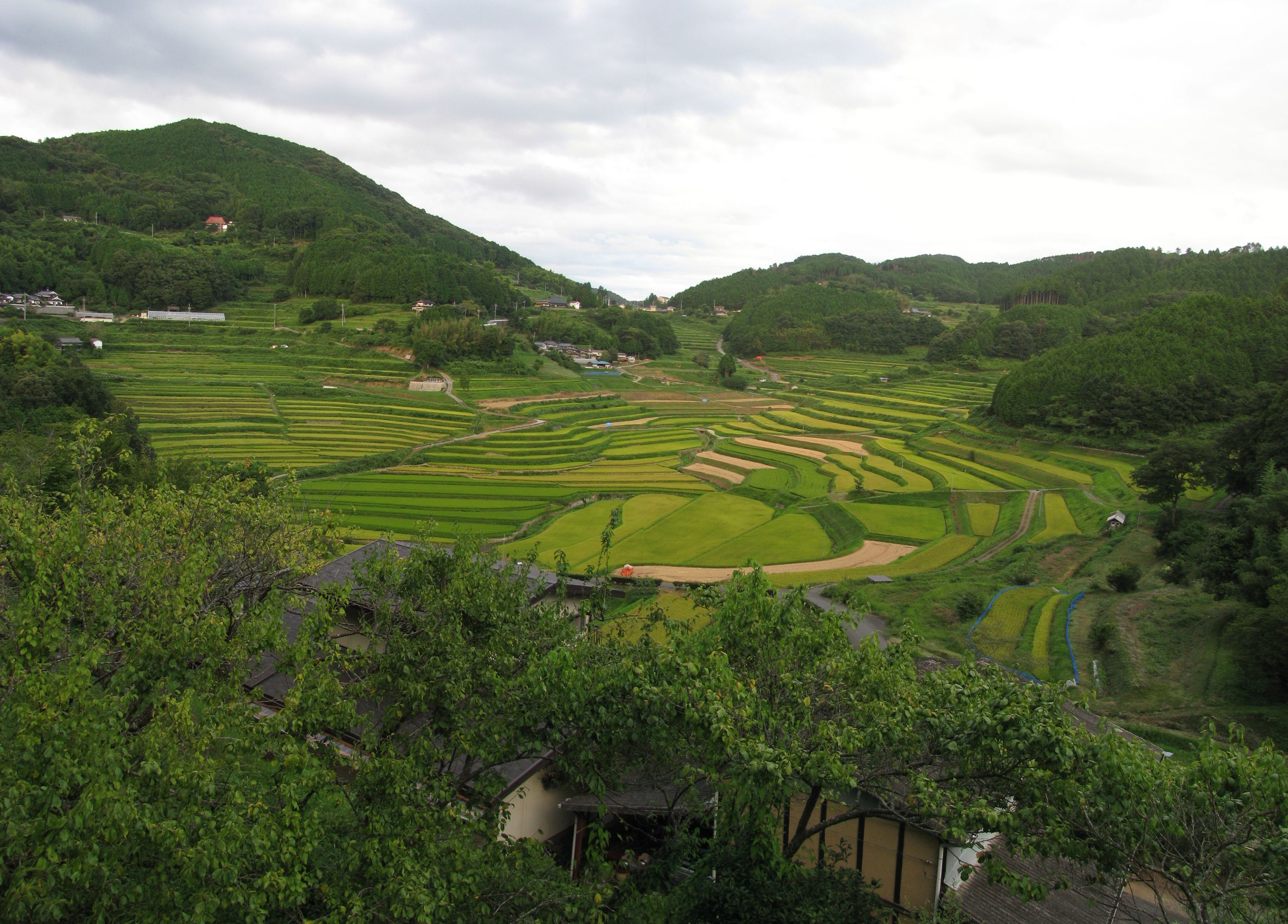
- Ohara-nishi rice terraces

- Flag Emblem
- Interactive map of Misaki
- Location in Japan
- Coordinates: 34°59′53.084″N 133°57′33.77″E
- Country: Japan
- Region: Chūgoku; San'yō
- Prefecture: Okayama
- District: Kume

Area
  - Total: 232.17 km^{2} (89.64 sq mi)

Population (December 31, 2022)
  - Total: 13,060
  - Density: 56.25/km^{2} (145.7/sq mi)
- Time zone: UTC+09:00 (JST)
- City hall address: 1735 Harada, Misaki-cho, Kume-gun, Okayama-ken 709-3717
- Website: Official website
- Symbols
- Flower: Ericaceae, Chrysanthemum
- Tree: Sakura

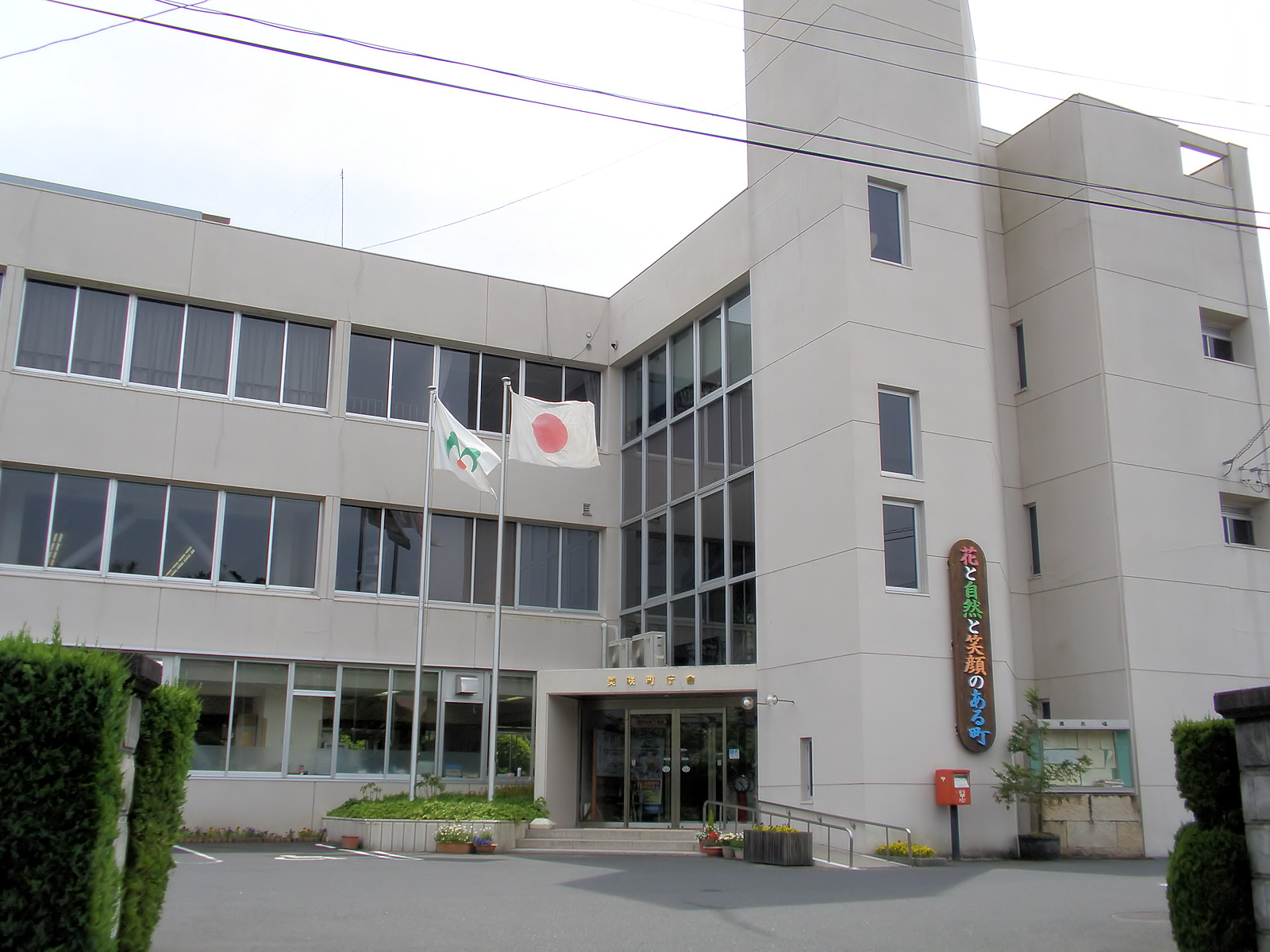
Misaki Town Hall

Misaki (美咲町, Misaki-chō) is a town located in Kume District, Okayama Prefecture, Japan. As of 31 December 2022, the town had an estimated population of 13,060 in 5867 households and a population density of 56 persons per km^{2}. The total area of the town is 232.17 square kilometres (89.64 sq mi).

== Geography ==
Misaki is located on the Kibi Plateau, in the east-central part of Okayama Prefecture. Most of the town is occupied by mountains and forests. The Asahi River runs through the center of the town, and Yoshii River runs through the eastern part. The urban center of the town is the area around JR Kamenokō Station, where the town hall, shops, and public facilities are located.

=== Neighboring municipalities ===
Okayama Prefecture

- Akaiwa
- Kibichūō
- Kumenan
- Maniwa
- Mimasaka
- Okayama
- Shōō
- Tsuyama
- Wake

== Climate ==
Misaki has a humid subtropical climate (Köppen Cfa) characterized by warm summers and cool winters with moderate snowfall. The average annual temperature in Misaki is 13.9 °C. The average annual rainfall is 1501 mm with September as the wettest month. The temperatures are highest on average in January, at around 25.9 °C, and lowest in January, at around 2.2 °C.

== Demography ==
Per Japanese census data, the population of Misaki has been as follows.

Historical population
Year	Pop.	±%
1950	35,218	—
1960	33,044	−6.2%
1970	23,373	−29.3%
1980	20,029	−14.3%
1990	18,972	−5.3%
2000	17,562	−7.4%
2010	15,642	−10.9%

== History ==
The area of Misaki was part of ancient Mimasaka Province. The city of Misaki was founded on March 22, 2005, by the merger of the towns of Asahi, Chūō and Yanahara, all from Kume District.

== Government ==
Misaki has a mayor-council form of government with a directly elected mayor and a unicameral town council of ten members. Misaki, collectively with the town of Kumenan, contributes one member to the Okayama Prefectural Assembly. In terms of national politics, the town is part of the Okayama 3rd district of the lower house of the Diet of Japan.

== Economy ==
The main industry in the area is agriculture. The main crops are rice, fruit trees such as pears and grapes, leaf tobacco, and poultry farming.

== Education ==
Misaki has five public elementary school and three public junior high school operated by the town government. The town does not have a high school.

== Transportation ==
=== Railway ===
JR West (JR West) - Tsuyama Line

- Obara - Kamenokō

=== Highways ===
- National Route 53
- National Route 374
- National Route 429

== Local attractions ==
Sightseeing spots include JR Kamenokō Station, which has a turtle-shaped station building, Sankyu Park, which is famous for its cherry blossoms and azaleas, Makiba no Yakata, a nature experience park, and an exhibition operation that utilizes an abandoned railroad line.
