= Kanagawa Station =

Kanagawa Station is the name of multiple train stations in Japan.

- Kanagawa Station (Kanagawa) (神奈川駅), in Kanagawa Prefecture
- Kanagawa Station (Okayama) (金川駅), in Okayama Prefecture
