= Sarayama Station =

Railway station in Tsuyama, Okayama Prefecture, Japan

Sarayama Station 佐良山駅
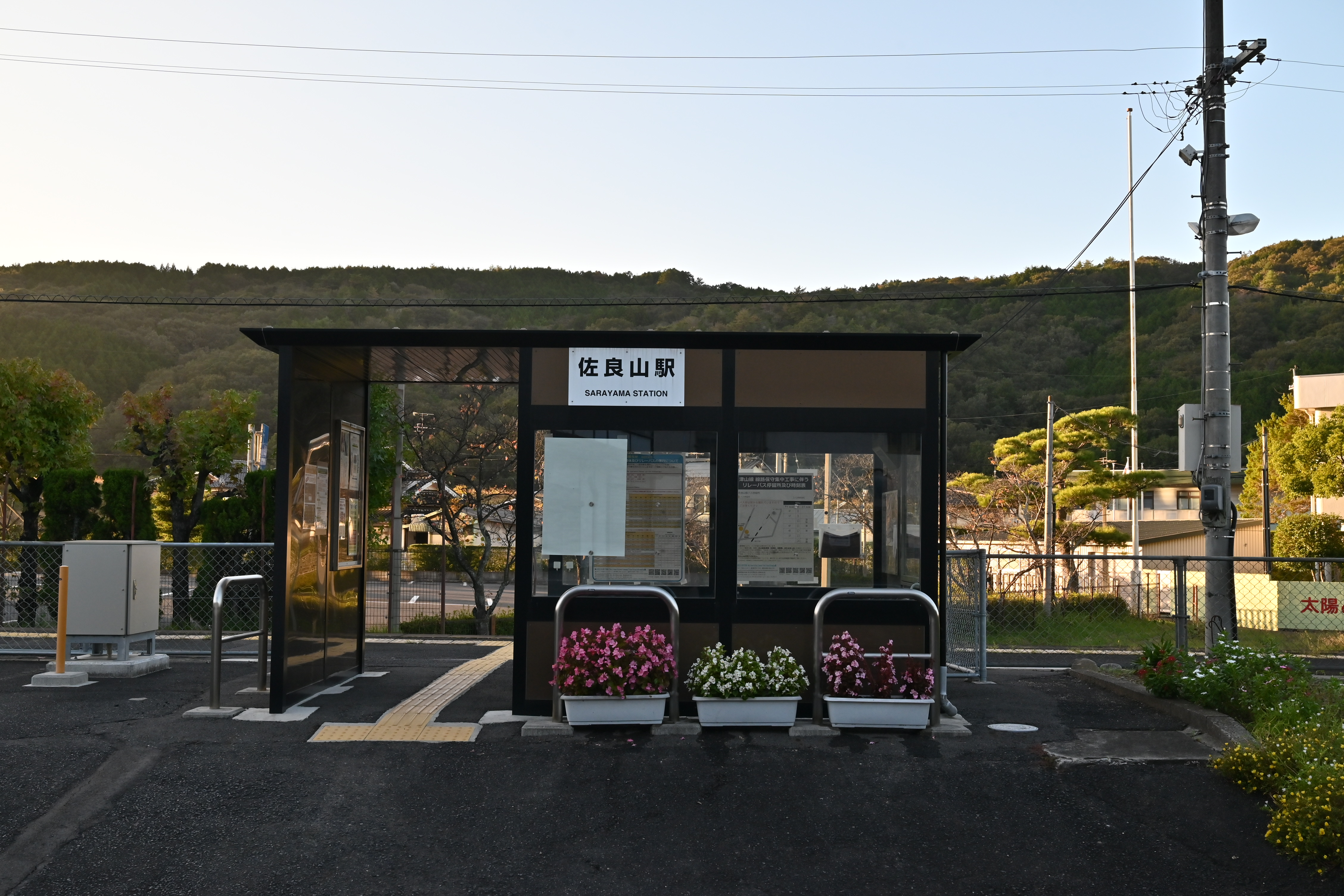
- Sarayama Station, October 2022

General information
- Location: Takao, Tsuyama-shi, Okayama-ken 708-0876; Japan
- Coordinates: 35°1′55.74″N 133°57′39.63″E
- Owner: West Japan Railway Company
- Operator: West Japan Railway Company
- Line: T Tsuyama Line
- Distance: 53.4 km (33.2 miles) from Okayama
- Platforms: 1 side platform
- Connections: Bus stop

Other information
- Status: Unstaffed
- Website: Official website

History
- Opened: 15 June 1937; 89 years ago

Passengers
- FY2019: 18 daily
Location
- Location within Okayama Prefecture Location within Japan

Sarayama Station (佐良山駅, Sarayama-eki) is a passenger railway station located in the city of Tsuyama, Okayama Prefecture, Japan, operated by West Japan Railway Company (JR West).

== Lines ==
Sarayama Station is served by the Tsuyama Line, and is located 53.4 kilometers from the southern terminus of the line at Okayama.

== Station layout ==
The station consists of one ground-level side platform serving a single bi-directional track. The station is unattended.

== Adjacent stations ==
| « | Service | » |
JR West Tsuyama Line
Rapid Kotobuki: Does not stop at this station
| Kamenokō | Rapid | Tsuyamaguchi |
| Kamenokō | Local | Tsuyamaguchi |

== History ==
Sarayama Station opened as a provisional station on June 15, 1937. It was upgraded a full passenger station on June 1, 1944. With the privatization of the Japan National Railways (JNR) on April 1, 1987, the station came under the aegis of the West Japan Railway Company. A new glassed-in station building and waiting room was completed in March 2019.

== Passenger statistics ==
In fiscal 2019, the station was used by an average of 18 passengers daily.

== Surrounding area ==
- Japan National Route 53.

== See also ==
- List of railway stations in Japan
