= Asahi, Okayama =

Dissolved municipality in Okayama prefecture, Japan

Asahi (旭町, Asahi-chō) was a town located in Kume District, Okayama Prefecture, Japan.

As of 2003, the town had an estimated population of 3,382 and a density of 40.75 persons per km^{2}. The total area was 82.99 km^{2}.

On March 22, 2005, Asahi, along with the towns of Chūō and Yanahara (all from Kume District), was merged to create the town of Misaki.
