= Yanahara, Okayama =

Dissolved municipality in Okayama prefecture, Japan

Yanahara (柵原町, Yanahara-chō) was a town located in Kume District, Okayama Prefecture, Japan.

As of 2003, the town had an estimated population of 6,793 and a density of 88.13 persons per km^{2}. The total area was 77.08 km^{2}.

On March 22, 2005, Yanahara, along with the towns of Asahi and Chūō (all from Kume District), was merged to create the town of Misaki.
