= Chūō, Okayama =

Dissolved municipality in Okayama prefecture, Japan

Chūō (中央町, Chūō-chō) was a town located in Kume District, Okayama Prefecture, Japan.

As of 2003, the town had an estimated population of 7,188 and a density of 99.72 persons per km^{2}. The total area was 72.08 km^{2}.

On March 22, 2005, Chūō, along with the towns of Asahi and Yanahara (all from Kume District), was merged to create the town of Misaki.
