= Tsuyamaguchi Station =

Railway station in Tsuyama, Okayama Prefecture, Japan

Tsuyamaguchi Station 津山口駅
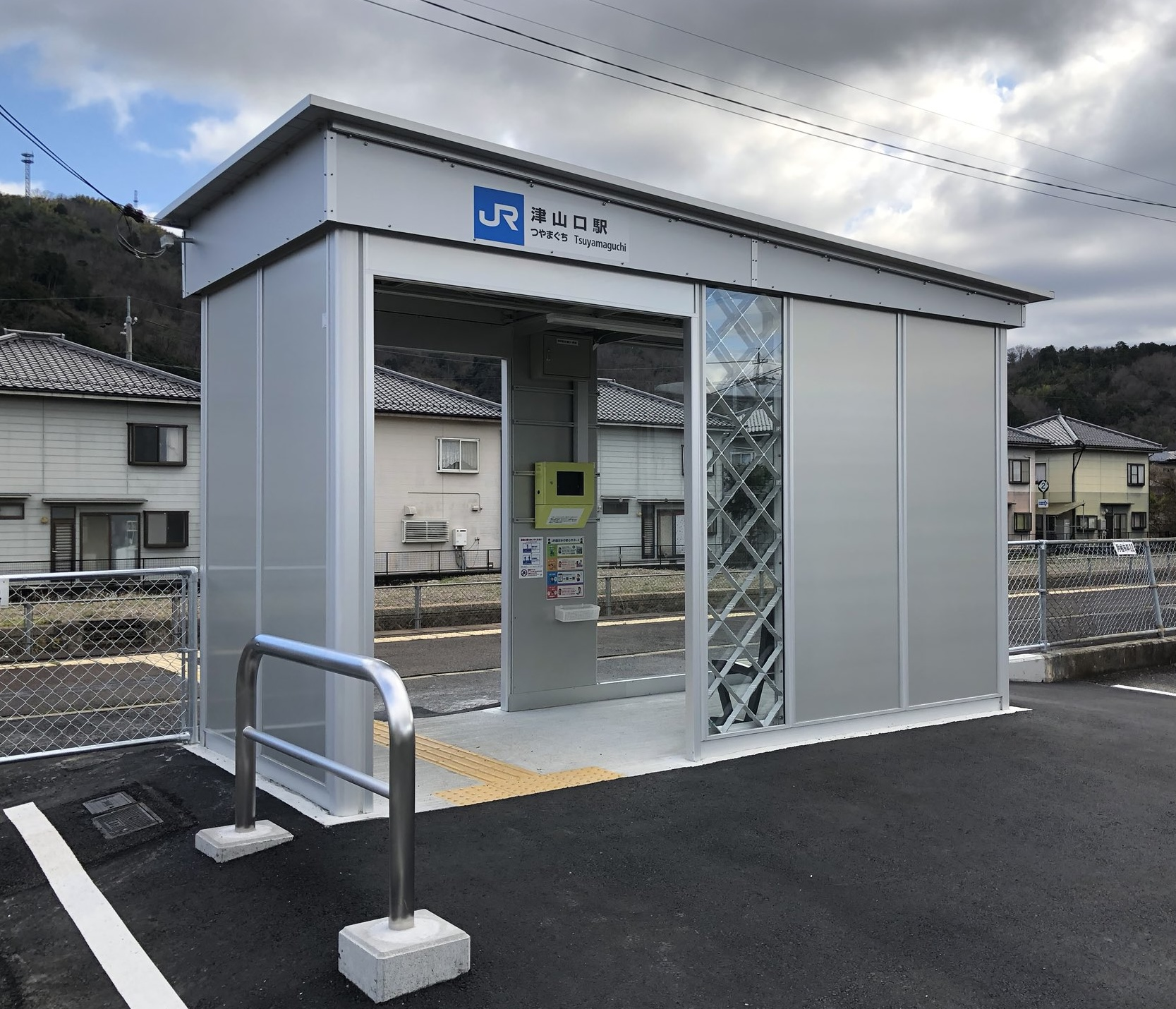
- Tsuyamaguchi Station, October 2022

General information
- Location: Tsuyamaguchi, Tsuyama-shi, Okayama-ken 708-0884; Japan
- Coordinates: 35°3′16.57″N 133°58′58.20″E
- Owner: West Japan Railway Company
- Operator: West Japan Railway Company
- Line: T Tsuyama Line
- Distance: 56.8 km (35.3 miles) from Okayama
- Platforms: 1 side platform
- Tracks: 1
- Connections: Bus stop

Construction
- Structure type: Ground level

Other information
- Status: Unstaffed
- Website: Official website

History
- Opened: 21 December 1898; 127 years ago
- Former names: Tsuyama (to 1923)

Passengers
- FY2019: 15 daily
Location
- Location within Okayama Prefecture Location within Japan

Tsuyamaguchi Station (津山口駅, Tsuyamaguchi-eki) is a passenger railway station located in the city of Tsuyama, Okayama Prefecture, Japan, operated by West Japan Railway Company (JR West).

== Lines ==
Tsuyamaguchi Station is served by the Tsuyama Line, and is located 56.8 kilometers from the southern terminus of the line at Okayama.

== Station layout ==
The station consists of one ground-level side platform serving a single bi-directional track. The station is unattended.

== Adjacent stations ==
«	Service	»
JR West Tsuyama Line
Rapid Kotobuki: Does not stop at this station
Sarayama	Rapid	Tsuyama
Sarayama	Local	Tsuyama

== History ==
Tsuyamaguchi Station opened as Tsuyama Station (津山駅) on December 21, 1898 in Sarayama Village (incorporated into Tsuyama City in 1941) across the Yoshii River from Tsuyama Town. However, in 1923, the current Tsuyama Station opened in a more convenient location within Fukuoka Village (towns and villages centered on Tsuyama Town merged to form Tsuyama City in 1929). The station was renamed Tsuyamaguchi Station, on August 1, 1923. Until the Chugoku Railway was nationalized in 1944, this station was the border station between the Chugoku Railway and the Japanese Government Railway Sakubi Line (later Kishin Line branch line which became the Tsuyama Line). With the privatization of the Japan National Railways (JNR) on April 1, 1987, the station came under the aegis of the West Japan Railway Company. A new station building was completed in March 2020. The station is unattended.

== Passenger statistics ==
In fiscal 2019, the station was used by an average of 15 passengers daily.

== Surrounding area ==
The surrounding area is a residential zone.

== See also ==
- List of railway stations in Japan
