= Asahigawa Dam =

Coordinates: 34°54′49″N 133°51′23″E

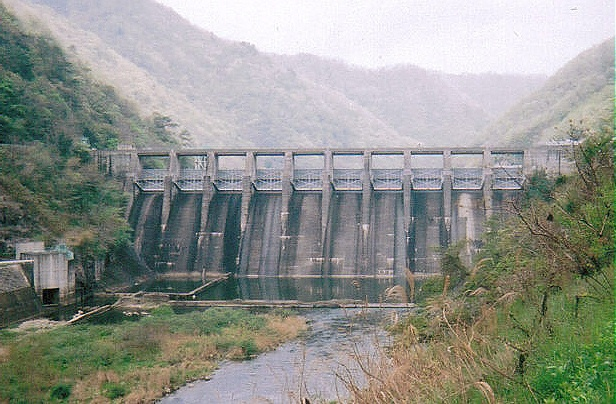
- Interactive map of Asahigawa Dam
- Location: Okayama, Okayama, Japan

Asahigawa Dam (Japanese: 旭川ダム) is a dam on Asahi River straddling the border between Kibichūō and northern Takebe, Okayama in Okayama Prefecture, Japan. The dam was completed in 1954.
