= Takebe, Okayama =

Area of Okayama, Japan

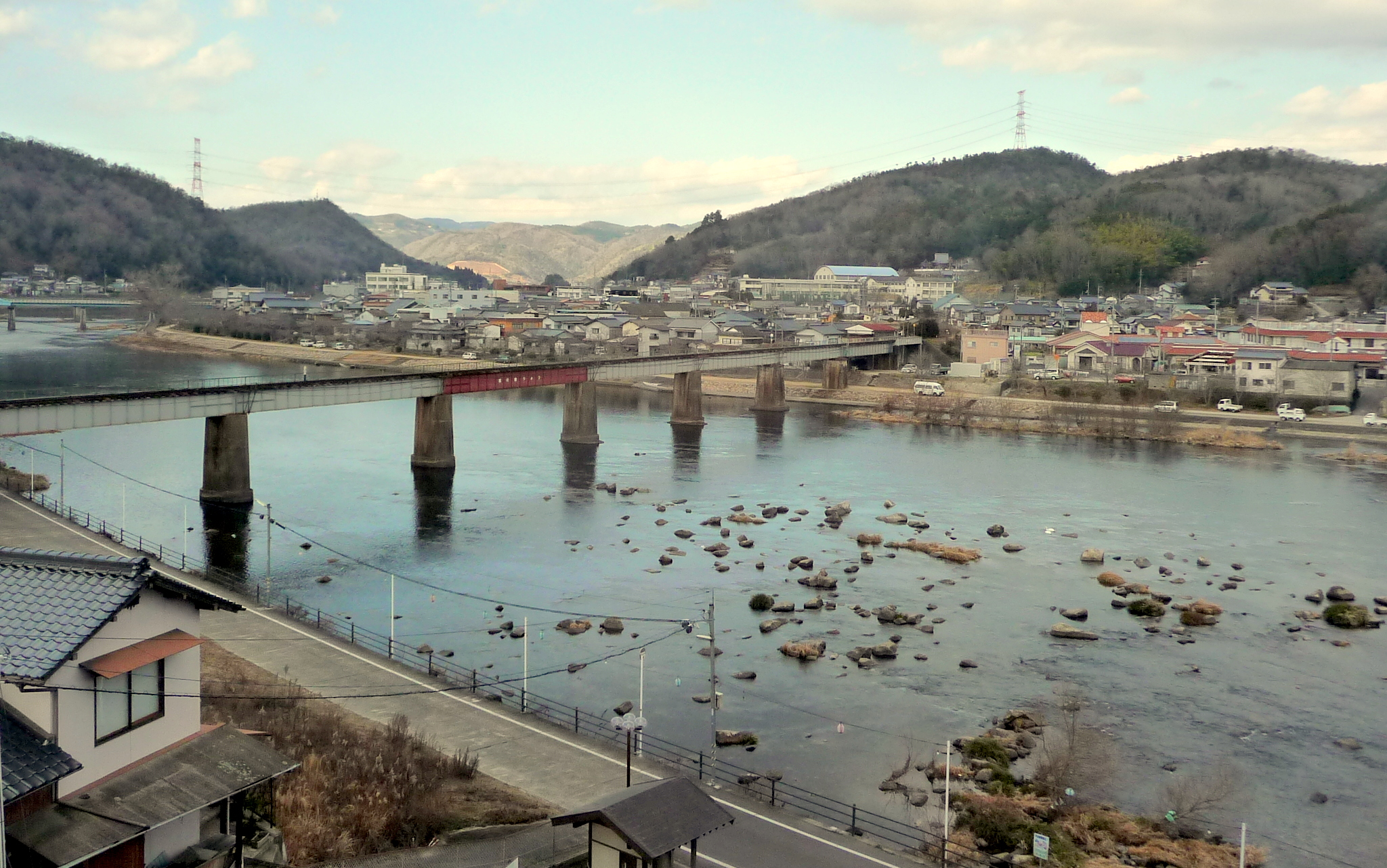
A view of Fukuwatari in Takebe, Okayama

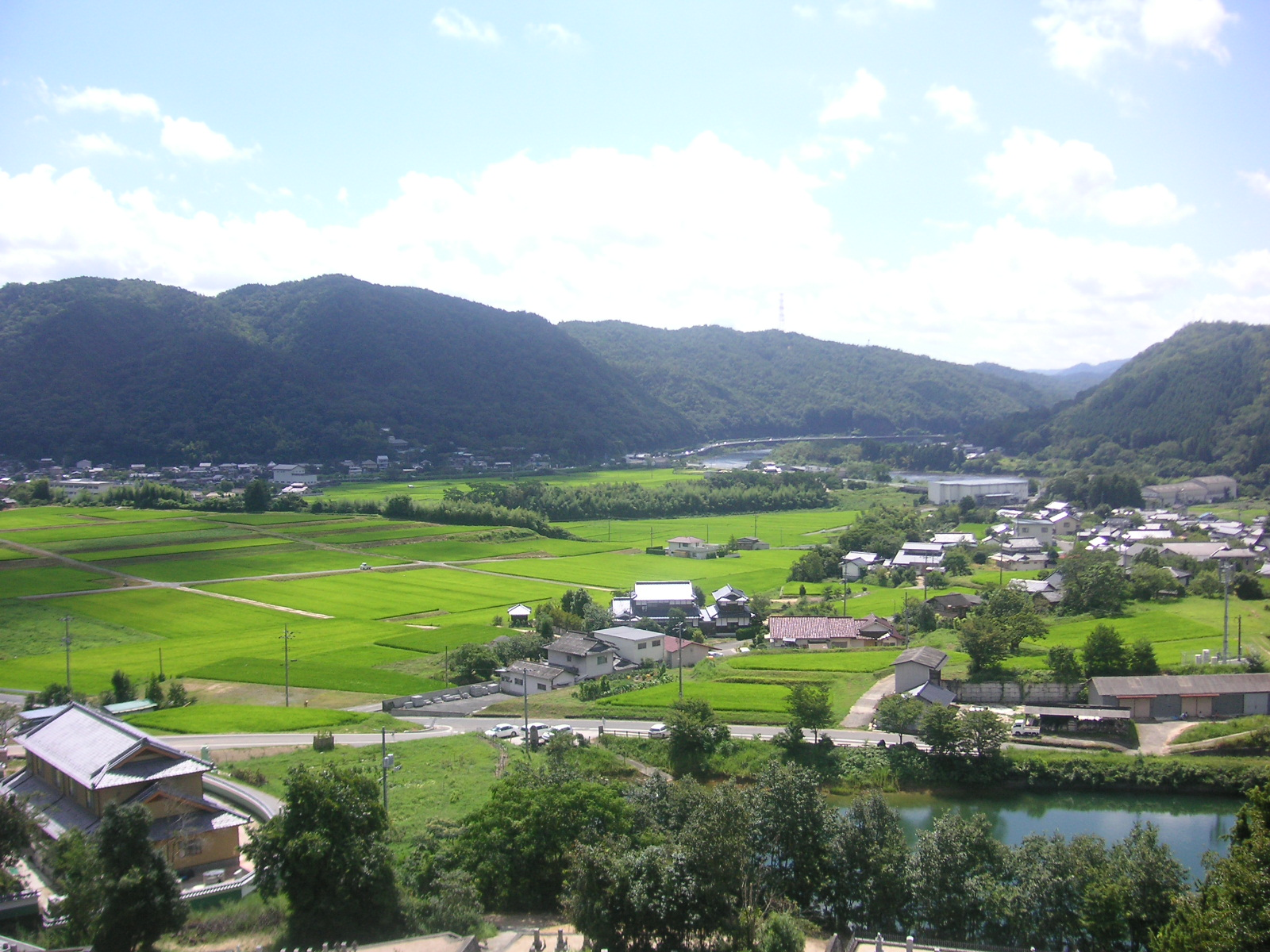
Rural landscape of Kawaguchi in Takebe, Okayama

Takebe (建部町, Takebe-chō) is a hilly and mountainous area located at the north end of Kita-ku in Okayama City, Okayama Prefecture, Japan.

== Population ==
As of September 30, 2010, the area had an estimated population of 6,382 and a density of 71.28 persons per km^{2}. The total area was 89.53 km^{2}.

== History ==
Takebe-chō was a town located in Mitsu District, Okayama Prefecture. But on January 22, 2007, Takebe, along with town of Seto (from Akaiwa District), was merged into the expanded city of Okayama.

== Attraction ==
- Asahigawa Dam
- Birthplace of Takenouchi-ryū
- Buraku-ji Temple
- Great Okayama Golf Club
- Joju-ji Temple
- Shichisha Hachimangū Shrine
- Shiro Jinja Shrine
- Forest Golf Club (Takebenomori Golf Club)
- Takebe no Mori Park
- Yahata Hotsprings (Onsen)

== Transportation ==
=== Train stations ===
- JR-West
  - Tsuyama Line: Fukuwatari
  - Tsuyama Line: Takebe

=== Major roads ===
- Route 53
- Route 484
