= Fukuwatari Station =

Railway station in Okayama, Japan

Fukuwatari Station 福渡駅
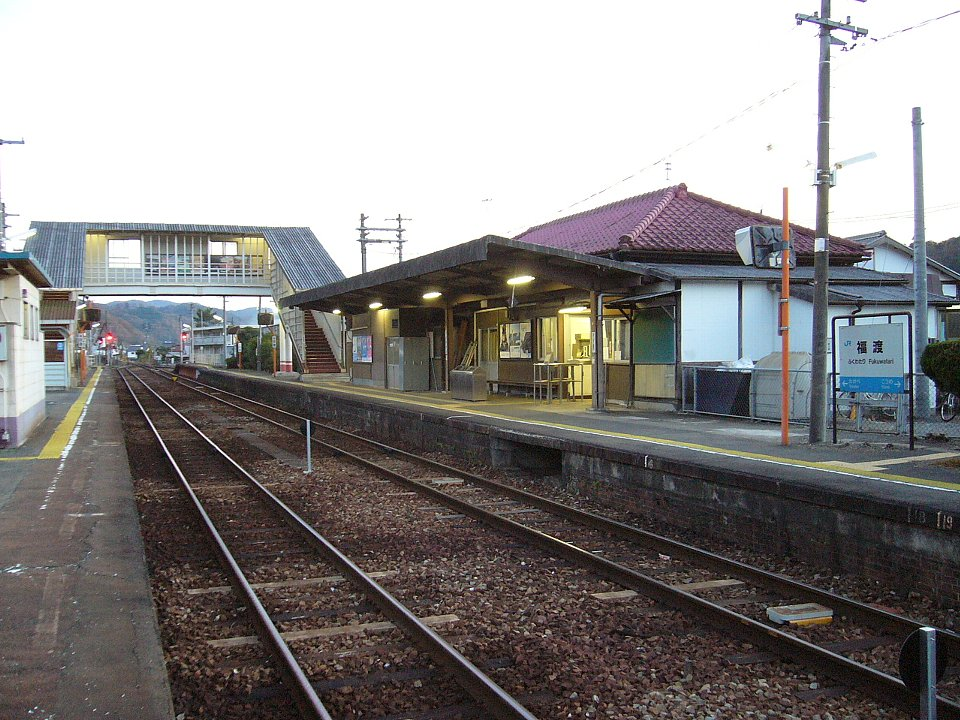
- Fukuwatari Station on the Tsuyama Line, south view of the premises

General information
- Location: Takebechō Fukuwatari 518, Kita-ku, Okayama-shi, Okayama-ken 709-3111; Japan
- Coordinates: 34°52′13.88″N 133°54′13.71″E
- Owner: West Japan Railway Company
- Operator: West Japan Railway Company
- Line: T Tsuyama Line
- Distance: 30.3 km (18.8 miles) from Okayama
- Platforms: 1 side + 1 island platform
- Connections: Bus stop

Other information
- Status: Unstaffed
- Website: Official website

History
- Opened: 21 December 1898; 127 years ago

Passengers
- FY2019: 267 daily
Location
- Location within Okayama Prefecture Location within Japan

Fukuwatari Station (福渡駅, Fukuwatari-eki) is a passenger railway station located in the Takebe-chō neighborhood of Kita-ku of the city of Okayama, Okayama Prefecture, Japan. It is operated by West Japan Railway Company (JR West).

== Lines ==
Fukuwatari Station is served by the Tsuyama Line, and is located 30.3 kilometers from the southern terminus of the line at Okayama.

== Station layout ==
The station consists of one ground-level side platform and one ground-level island platform serving three tracks. The wooden station building is located on the side of Platform 1, which is the side platform, and is connected to Platforms 2 and 3, which are on the island platform, via a footbridge. The island platform has a waiting room. The station is unattended.

=== Platforms ===
1	■ TTsuyama Line	for Tsuyama and Tottori
2, 3	■ T Tsuyama Line	for Okayama

== Adjacent stations ==
«	Service	»
JR West Tsuyama Line
Takebe	Rapid Kotobuki	Yuge
Takebe	Rapid	Kōme
Takebe	Local	Kōme

== History ==
Fukuwatari Station opened on December 21, 1898 with the opening of the Tsuyama Line. With the privatization of the Japan National Railways (JNR) on April 1, 1987, the station came under the aegis of the West Japan Railway Company.

== Passenger statistics ==
In fiscal 2019, the station was used by an average of 267 passengers daily.

== Surrounding area ==
- Okayama City Kita Ward Office Takebe Branch (Former Takebe Town Office)
- Okayama Takebe Medical Welfare College (former Okayama Prefectural Fukuwatari High School)

== See also ==
- List of railway stations in Japan
