= Kume District, Okayama =

District in Okayama prefecture, Japan

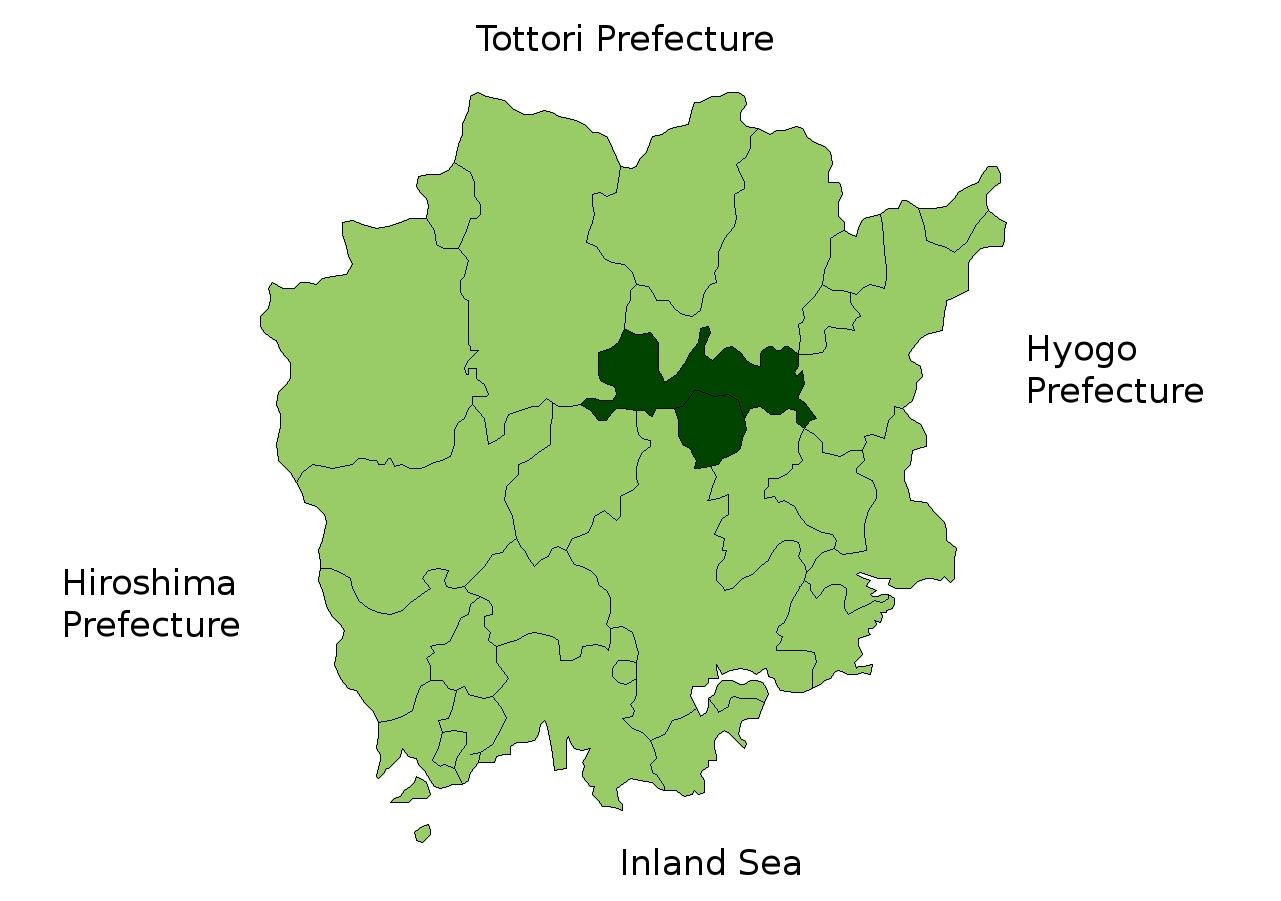
Location of Kume District in Okayama Prefecture

Kume (久米郡, Kume-gun) is a district in Okayama Prefecture, Japan.

As of 2003, the district has an estimated population of 30,640 and a density of 79.56 inhabitants per square kilometre (206.1/sq mi). The total area is 385.14 km^{2} (148.70 sq mi).

== Towns and villages ==
- Kumenan
- Misaki

== Mergers ==
- On February 28, 2005, the town of Kume merged into the city of Tsuyama.
- On March 22, 2005, the towns of Chūō, Asahi, and Yanahara merged to form the new town of Misaki.
