= Tsuyama Station =

Railway station in Tsuyama, Okayama Prefecture, Japan

Tsuyama Station 津山駅
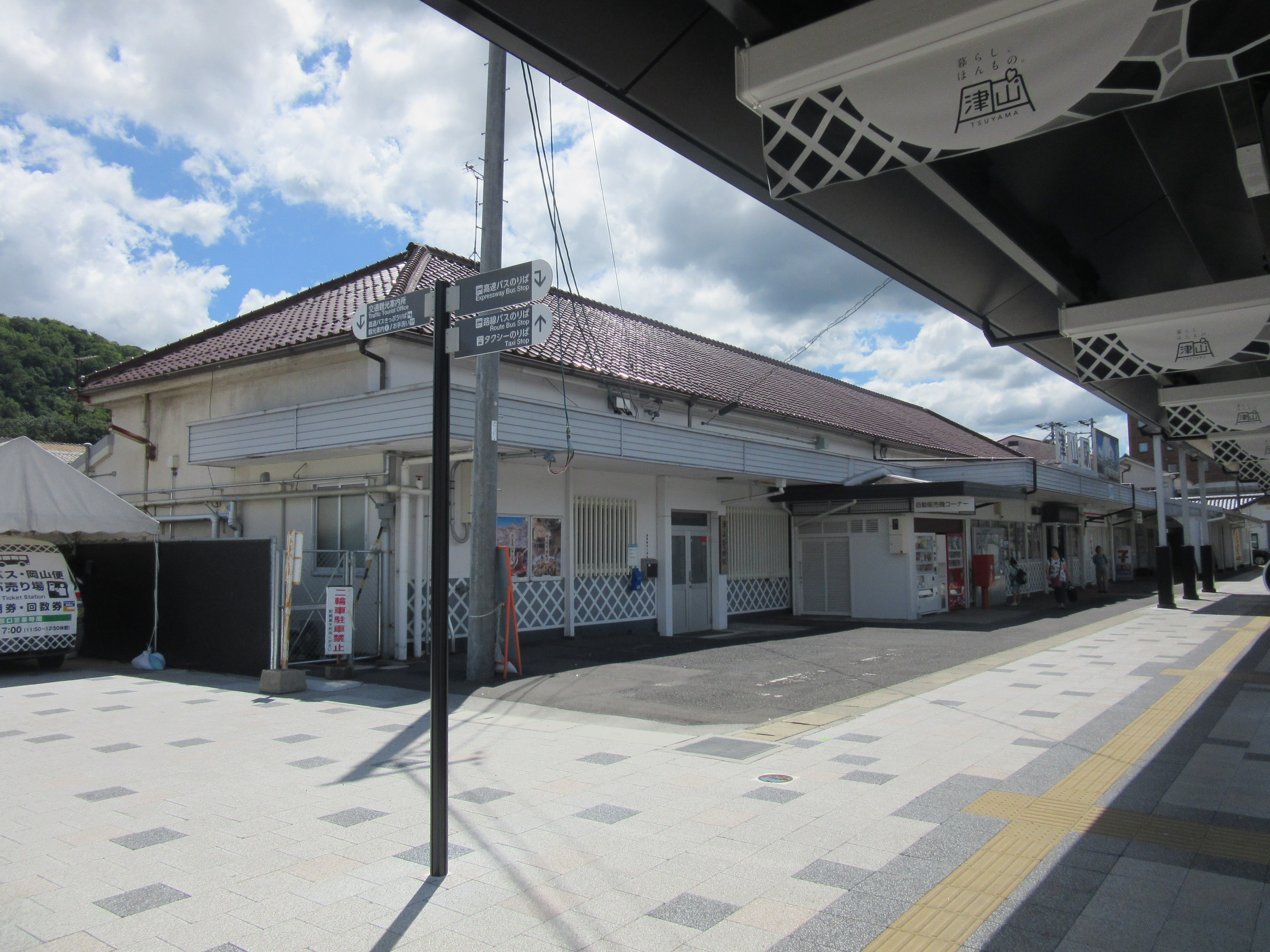
- Tsuyama Station in August 2017

General information
- Location: Nakakitashimo, Tsuyama-shi, Okayama-ken 708-0882; Japan
- Coordinates: 35°3′17.10″N 134°0′10.85″E
- Owner: West Japan Railway Company
- Operator: West Japan Railway Company
- Lines: B Inbi Line; K Kishin Line; T Tsuyama Line
- Distance: 86.3 km (53.6 miles) from Himeji; 58.7 km (36.5 miles) from Okayama
- Platforms: 2 island platforms
- Connections: Bus stop

Other information
- Status: Staffed (Midori no Madoguchi )
- Website: Official website

History
- Opened: 21 August 1923; 103 years ago

Passengers
- FY2019: 1973 daily

Services
Preceding station	JR West	Following station
Innoshō towards Niimi	Kishin Line Local	Higashi-Tsuyama towards Himeji
Terminus	Inbi Line Local	Higashi-Tsuyama towards Tottori
Tsuyamaguchi towards Okayama	Tsuyama Line Rapid Kotobuki Local	Terminus
Location
- Location within Okayama Prefecture Location within Japan

Tsuyama Station (津山駅, Tsuyama-eki) is a junction passenger railway station located in the city of Tsuyama, Okayama Prefecture, Japan, operated by West Japan Railway Company (JR West).

== Lines ==
Tsuyama Station is served by the Kishin Line and Tsuyama Line. It is located 86.3 kilometers from the southern terminus of the Kishin Line at Himeji and 58.7 kilometers from the southern terminus of the Tsuyama Line at Okayama. Train of the Inbi Line normally continue past the nominal terminus of the line at Higashi-Tsuyama using the tracks of the Tsuyama Line to terminate at Tsuyama Station.

== Station layout ==
The station consists of two ground-level island platforms connected to the station building by an underground passage. The station has a Midori no Madoguchi staffed ticket office.

== History ==
Tsuyama Station opened on 21 August 1923. With the privatization of Japanese National Railways (JNR) on 1 April 1987, the station came under the control of JR West.

== Passenger statistics ==
In fiscal 2019, the station was used by an average of 1,973 passengers daily.

== Surrounding area ==
- Tsuyama Castle Ruins (Tsuruyama Park)
- Japan National Route 181

== See also ==
- List of railway stations in Japan
