= Japan National Route 53 =

National highway in Japan

National Route 53
- 国道53号

Route information
- Length: 138.5 km (86.1 mi)
- Existed: 1 April 1963–present

Major junctions
- North end: National Route 9 in Tottori
- South end: National Route 30 / National Route 180 / National Route 250 in Kita-ku, Okayama

Location
- Country: Japan

Highway system
- National highways of Japan; Expressways of Japan
← National Route 52	→ National Route 54

National Route 53 is a national highway of Japan connecting Okayama and Tottori.

== History ==
Route 53 was originally designated on 18 May 1953 as National Route 179, and this was redesignated as Route 53 when the route was promoted to a class 1 highway.

== Route data ==
- Length: 138.5 km (86.06 mi).
