= Kita-ku, Okayama =

Ward of Okayama in Chūgoku, Japan

Coordinates: 34°39′18″N 133°55′10″E

Map

Location of Kita-ku in Okayama Prefecture

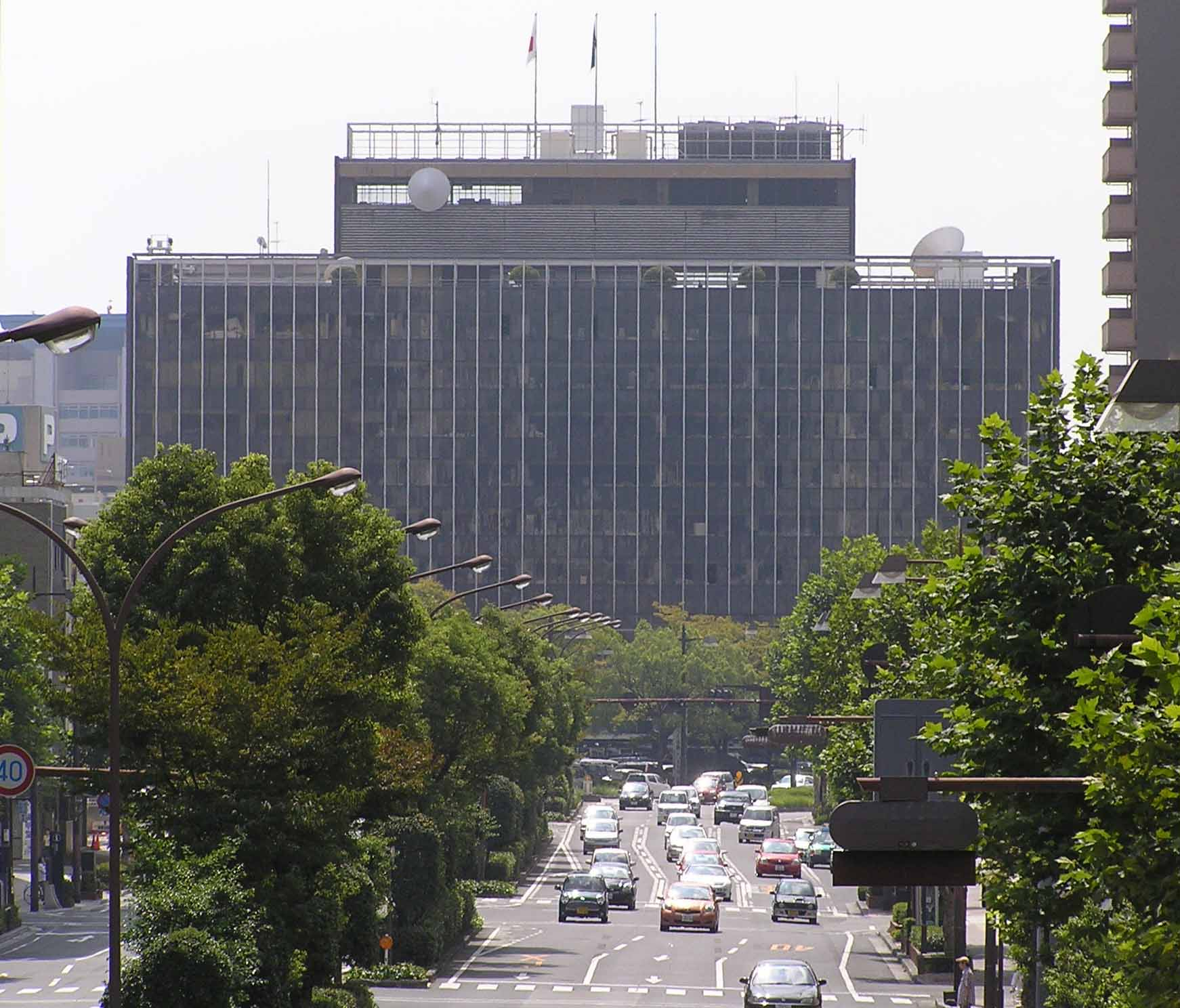
Kita ward office

Kita-ku (北区) is one of four wards of Okayama, Okayama Prefecture, Japan. The ward has an area of 451.03 km^{2} and a population of 295,312. The population density is 655 per square kilometer. The name means "North Ward."

The wards of Okayama were established when Okayama became a city designated by government ordinance on April 1, 2009.

The city has its municipal headquarters in kita-ku.

The South Korean government maintains the Korea Education Institution (Korean: 오카야마한국교육원, Japanese: 岡山韓国教育院) in Kita-ku.

== Geography ==
=== Climate ===
Kurashiki has a humid subtropical climate (Köppen climate classification Cfa). The average annual temperature in Kurashiki is 14.0 °C (57.2 °F). The average annual rainfall is 1,249.8 mm (49.20 in) with September as the wettest month. The temperatures are highest on average in August, at around 26.3 °C (79.3 °F), and lowest in January, at around 2.5 °C (36.5 °F). The highest temperature ever recorded in Kurashiki was 39.1 °C (102.4 °F) on 31 July 2025; the coldest temperature ever recorded was −10.1 °C (13.8 °F) on 9 January 2021.

Climate data for Fukuwatari, Kita-ku (1991−2020 normals, extremes 1979−present)
Month	Jan	Feb	Mar	Apr	May	Jun	Jul	Aug	Sep	Oct	Nov	Dec	Year
Record high °C (°F)	17.2 (63.0)	21.9 (71.4)	25.2 (77.4)	29.7 (85.5)	33.5 (92.3)	35.9 (96.6)	39.1 (102.4)	38.5 (101.3)	36.4 (97.5)	32.1 (89.8)	26.3 (79.3)	21.0 (69.8)	39.1 (102.4)
Mean daily maximum °C (°F)	8.6 (47.5)	9.8 (49.6)	13.6 (56.5)	19.6 (67.3)	24.6 (76.3)	27.4 (81.3)	31.1 (88.0)	32.5 (90.5)	28.3 (82.9)	22.6 (72.7)	16.5 (61.7)	10.9 (51.6)	20.5 (68.8)
Daily mean °C (°F)	2.5 (36.5)	3.3 (37.9)	6.7 (44.1)	12.2 (54.0)	17.3 (63.1)	21.5 (70.7)	25.5 (77.9)	26.3 (79.3)	22.2 (72.0)	15.9 (60.6)	9.7 (49.5)	4.5 (40.1)	14.0 (57.1)
Mean daily minimum °C (°F)	−2.3 (27.9)	−1.9 (28.6)	0.7 (33.3)	5.4 (41.7)	10.9 (51.6)	16.6 (61.9)	21.4 (70.5)	21.9 (71.4)	17.6 (63.7)	10.9 (51.6)	4.7 (40.5)	−0.1 (31.8)	8.8 (47.9)
Record low °C (°F)	−10.1 (13.8)	−9.5 (14.9)	−6.5 (20.3)	−3.7 (25.3)	0.5 (32.9)	6.6 (43.9)	12.0 (53.6)	13.9 (57.0)	5.6 (42.1)	0.2 (32.4)	−3.1 (26.4)	−7.7 (18.1)	−10.1 (13.8)
Average precipitation mm (inches)	40.4 (1.59)	48.5 (1.91)	91.9 (3.62)	102.1 (4.02)	131.0 (5.16)	171.0 (6.73)	200.3 (7.89)	111.2 (4.38)	159.2 (6.27)	95.6 (3.76)	56.5 (2.22)	46.7 (1.84)	1,249.8 (49.20)
Average precipitation days (≥ 1.0 mm)	5.4	6.6	9.2	9.1	9.6	11.0	11.3	8.4	9.5	7.2	6.2	6.0	99.5
Mean monthly sunshine hours	144.1	142.3	174.0	192.3	202.9	142.1	156.6	193.8	157.8	169.6	147.6	139.1	1,962.1
Source: Japan Meteorological Agency

Climate data for Okayama Airport/Nichiō-ji, Kita-ku (2003−2020 normals, extremes 2003−present)
Month	Jan	Feb	Mar	Apr	May	Jun	Jul	Aug	Sep	Oct	Nov	Dec	Year
Record high °C (°F)	15.9 (60.6)	21.0 (69.8)	25.1 (77.2)	28.5 (83.3)	31.1 (88.0)	34.2 (93.6)	37.4 (99.3)	37.6 (99.7)	36.0 (96.8)	30.7 (87.3)	24.9 (76.8)	19.7 (67.5)	37.6 (99.7)
Mean daily maximum °C (°F)	7.7 (45.9)	8.9 (48.0)	12.7 (54.9)	18.4 (65.1)	23.3 (73.9)	26.2 (79.2)	29.6 (85.3)	31.4 (88.5)	27.3 (81.1)	21.8 (71.2)	16.0 (60.8)	9.9 (49.8)	19.4 (67.0)
Daily mean °C (°F)	2.9 (37.2)	3.9 (39.0)	7.1 (44.8)	12.6 (54.7)	17.7 (63.9)	21.4 (70.5)	25.1 (77.2)	26.4 (79.5)	22.5 (72.5)	16.8 (62.2)	10.9 (51.6)	5.2 (41.4)	14.4 (57.9)
Mean daily minimum °C (°F)	−1.4 (29.5)	−0.8 (30.6)	1.7 (35.1)	6.9 (44.4)	12.2 (54.0)	17.3 (63.1)	21.7 (71.1)	22.6 (72.7)	18.7 (65.7)	12.3 (54.1)	6.2 (43.2)	0.7 (33.3)	9.8 (49.7)
Record low °C (°F)	−9.1 (15.6)	−8.1 (17.4)	−4.9 (23.2)	−2.1 (28.2)	3.4 (38.1)	9.1 (48.4)	14.8 (58.6)	15.4 (59.7)	10.7 (51.3)	4.6 (40.3)	−2.3 (27.9)	−5.9 (21.4)	−9.1 (15.6)
Average precipitation mm (inches)	30.4 (1.20)	50.6 (1.99)	85.4 (3.36)	100.8 (3.97)	116.5 (4.59)	170.1 (6.70)	208.3 (8.20)	104.8 (4.13)	155.8 (6.13)	96.3 (3.79)	57.3 (2.26)	52.0 (2.05)	1,228.3 (48.36)
Average precipitation days (≥ 1.0 mm)	4.6	6.8	8.2	8.9	8.8	10.7	10.8	7.5	9.1	7.3	6.0	5.7	94.4
Source: Japan Meteorological Agency
