= Nagi Station =

Railway station in Chizu, Tottori Prefecture, Japan

Nagi Station 那岐駅
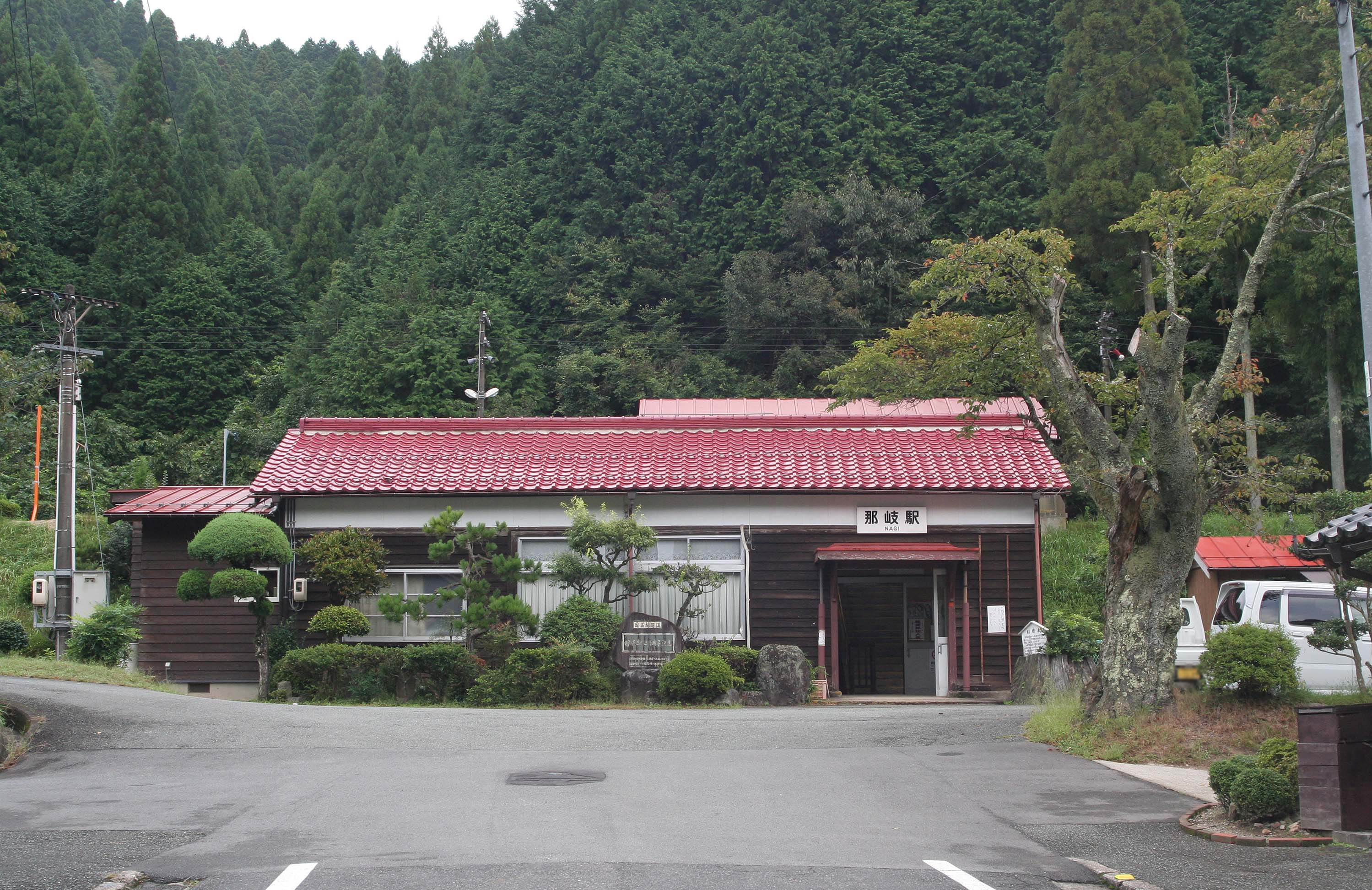
- Nagi Station, October 2007

General information
- Location: Ose, Chizu-cho, Yazu-gun, Tottori-ken 689-1451; Japan
- Coordinates: 35°12′49.65″N 134°12′35.99″E
- Owner: JR West
- Operator: JR West
- Line: Inbi Line
- Distance: 38.5 km (23.9 miles) from Tottori
- Platforms: 2 side platforms
- Connections: Bus stop

Other information
- Status: Unstaffed
- Website: Official website

History
- Opened: 1 July 1932

Passengers
- FY2015: 54 daily
Location
- Location within Tottori Prefecture Location within Japan

Nagi Station (那岐駅, Nagi-eki) is a passenger railway station located in the town of Chizu, Yazu District, Tottori Prefecture, Japan.. It is operated by the West Japan Railway Company (JR West).

== Lines ==
Nagi Station is served by the Inbi Line, and is located 38.5 kilometers from the terminus of the line at Tottori. Only local trains stop at this station.

== Station layout ==
The station consists of two ground-level opposed side platforms connected to the station building by a level crossing. The station is unattended.

=== Platforms ===
1	■ Inbi Line	for Higashi-Tsuyama and Tsuyama
2	■ Inbi Line	for Tottori

== Adjacent stations ==
«	Service	»
West Japan Railway Company (JR West) Inbi Line
Haji	Rapid	Mimasaka-Kawai
Haji	Local	Mimasaka-Kawai

== History ==
Nagi Station opened on July 1, 1932. With the privatization of the Japan National Railways (JNR) on April 1, 1987, the station came under the aegis of the West Japan Railway Company.

== Passenger statistics ==
In fiscal 2015, the station was used by an average of 54 passengers daily.

== Surrounding area ==
- Japan National Route 53

== See also ==
- List of railway stations in Japan
