= Takano Station =

Railway station in Tsuyama, Okayama Prefecture, Japan

Takano Station 高野駅
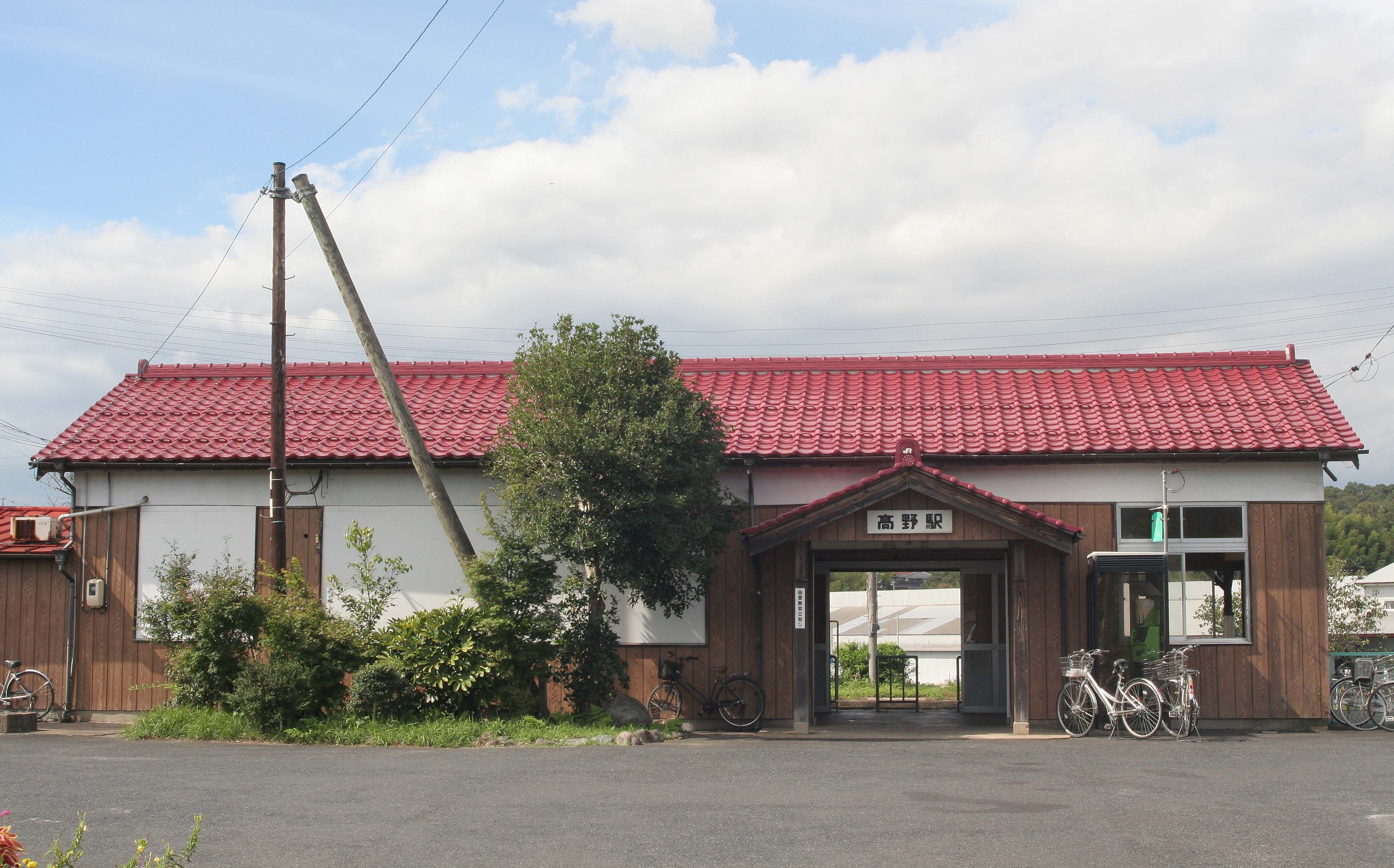
- Takano Station, October 2007

General information
- Location: 1896 Takano-Hongo, Tsuyama-shi, Okayama-ken 708-1125; Japan
- Coordinates: 35°4′49.65″N 134°3′57.63″E
- Owner: West Japan Railway Company
- Operator: West Japan Railway Company
- Line: B Inbi Line
- Distance: 66.7 km (41.4 miles) from Tottori
- Platforms: 1 side platform
- Connections: Bus stop

Other information
- Status: Unstaffed
- Website: Official website

History
- Opened: 15 March 1928; 98 years ago

Passengers
- FY2019: 31 daily
Location
- Location within Okayama Prefecture Location within Japan

Takano Station (高野駅, Takano-eki) is a passenger railway station located in the city of Tsuyama, Okayama Prefecture, Japan, operated by West Japan Railway Company (JR West).

== Lines ==
Takano Station is served by the Inbi Line, and is located 66.7 kilometers from the southern terminus of the line at Tottori.

== Station layout ==
The station consists of one ground-level side platform serving a single bi-directional track. The station is unattended.

== Adjacent stations ==
«	Service	»
JR West Inbi Line
Mimasaka-Kamo	Rapid	Higashi-Tsuyama
Mimasaka-Takio	Local	Higashi-Tsuyama

== History ==
Takano Station opened on March 15, 19281. With the privatization of the Japan National Railways (JNR) on April 1, 1987, the station came under the aegis of the West Japan Railway Company.

== Passenger statistics ==
In fiscal 2019, the station was used by an average of 31 passengers daily.

== Surrounding area ==
- Japan National Route 53

== See also ==
- List of railway stations in Japan
