= Mochigase Station =

Railway station in Tottori, Tottori Prefecture, Japan

Mochigase Station 用瀬駅
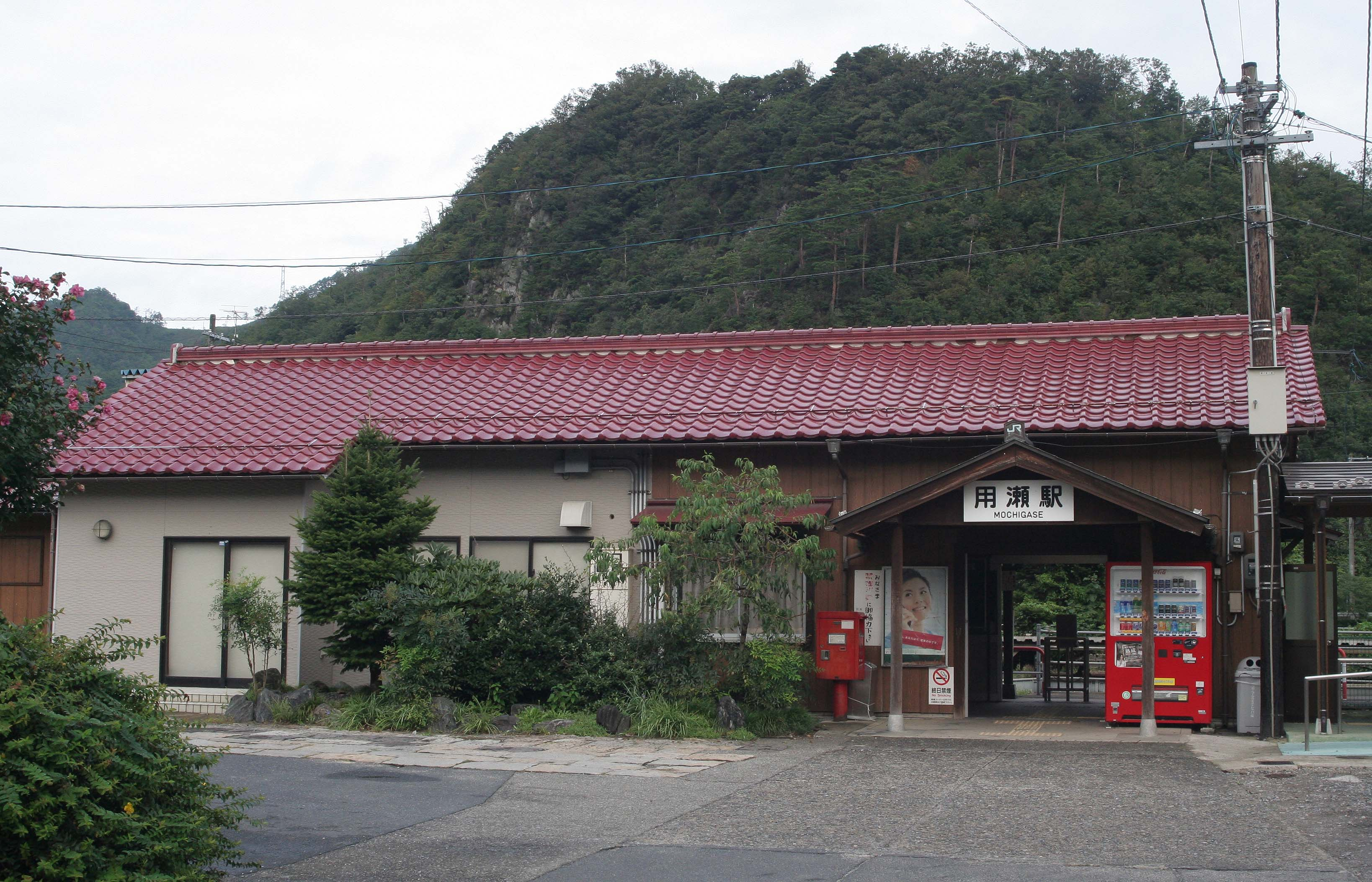
- Mochigase Station, October 2007

General information
- Location: Mochigasecho Mochigase, Tottori-shi, Tottori-ken 689-1201; Japan
- Coordinates: 35°20′36.62″N 134°12′18.13″E
- Operator: JR West
- Line: Inbi Line
- Distance: 21.2 km (13.2 miles) from Tottori
- Platforms: 1 island platforms
- Tracks: 2

Construction
- Structure type: At grade

Other information
- Status: Unstaffed
- Website: Official website

History
- Opened: 20 December 1919

Passengers
- 2020: 66 daily

Services
| Preceding station | JR West | Following station |
|---|---|---|
| Inaba-Yashiro towards Tsuyama | Inbi Line Local | Takagari towards Tottori |
Location
- Location within Tottori Prefecture Location within Japan

Mochigase Station (用瀬駅, Mochigase-eki) is a passenger railway station located in the city of Tottori, Tottori Prefecture, Japan. It is operated by the West Japan Railway Company (JR West).

== Lines ==
Mochigase Station is served by the Inbi Line, and is located 21.1 kilometers from the terminus of the line at Tottori.

== Station layout ==
The station consists of one ground-level island platform connected to the wooden station building by a level crossing. The station is unattended.

=== Platforms ===
| 1 | ■ Inbi Line | for Chizu, and Kamigōri |
| 2 | ■ Inbi Line | for Tottori |

== History ==
Mochigase Station opened on December 20, 1919. With the privatization of the Japan National Railways (JNR) on April 1, 1987, the station came under the aegis of the West Japan Railway Company.

== Passenger statistics ==
In fiscal 2020, the station was used by an average of 66 passengers daily.

== Surrounding area ==
- Tottori City Hall Yase Town General Branch
- Tottori City Chiyonami Junior High School

== See also ==
- List of railway stations in Japan
