= Mimasaka-Kawai Station =

Railway station in Tsuyama, Okayama Prefecture, Japan

Mimasaka-Kawai Station 美作河井駅
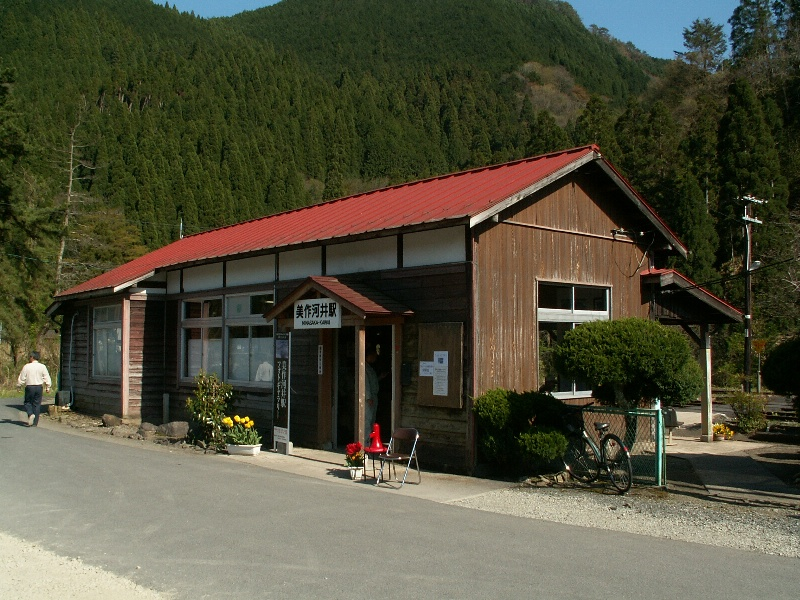
- Mimasaka-Kawai Station, April 2007

General information
- Location: 51 Kamocho Yamashita, Tsuyama-shi, Okayama-ken 709-3913; Japan
- Coordinates: 35°12′19.35″N 134°6′25.17″E
- Owner: West Japan Railway Company
- Operator: West Japan Railway Company
- Line: B Inbi Line
- Distance: 48.5 km (30.1 miles) from Tottori
- Platforms: 1 side platform
- Connections: Bus stop

Other information
- Status: Unstaffed
- Website: Official website

History
- Opened: 12 September 1931; 94 years ago

Passengers
- FY2019: 11 daily
Location
- Location within Okayama Prefecture Location within Japan

Mimasaka-Kawai Station (美作河井駅, Mimasaka-Kawai-eki) is a passenger railway station located in the city of Tsuyama, Okayama Prefecture, Japan, operated by West Japan Railway Company (JR West).

== Lines ==
Mimasaka-Kawai Station is served by the Inbi Line, and is located 48.5 kilometers from the southern terminus of the line at Tottori.

== Station layout ==
The station consists of one ground-level side platform serving a single bi-directional track. It used have an island platform and side platform for one siding track, but in 1997 these facilities were removed, leaving the side platform connected to the station building by a level crossing. The station is unattended.

== Adjacent stations ==
«	Service	»
JR West Inbi Line
Nagi	Rapid	Chiwa
Nagi	Local	Chiwa

== History ==
Mimasaka-Kawai Station opened on September 12, 1931. With the privatization of the Japan National Railways (JNR) on April 1, 1987, the station came under the aegis of the West Japan Railway Company.

== Passenger statistics ==
In fiscal 2019, the station was used by an average of 11 passengers daily.

== Surrounding area ==
- Okayama Prefectural Road/Tottori Prefectural Road No. 6 Tsuyama Chizu Hatto Line
- Okayama Prefectural Road/Tottori Prefectural Road No. 118 Kamoyose Line
- Okayama Prefectural Road 208 Mimasaka Kawai Station Line

== See also ==
- List of railway stations in Japan
