= Mimasaka Kokubun-ji =

Buddhist temple in Okayama Prefecture, Japan

Mimasaka Kokubun-ji 美作国分寺
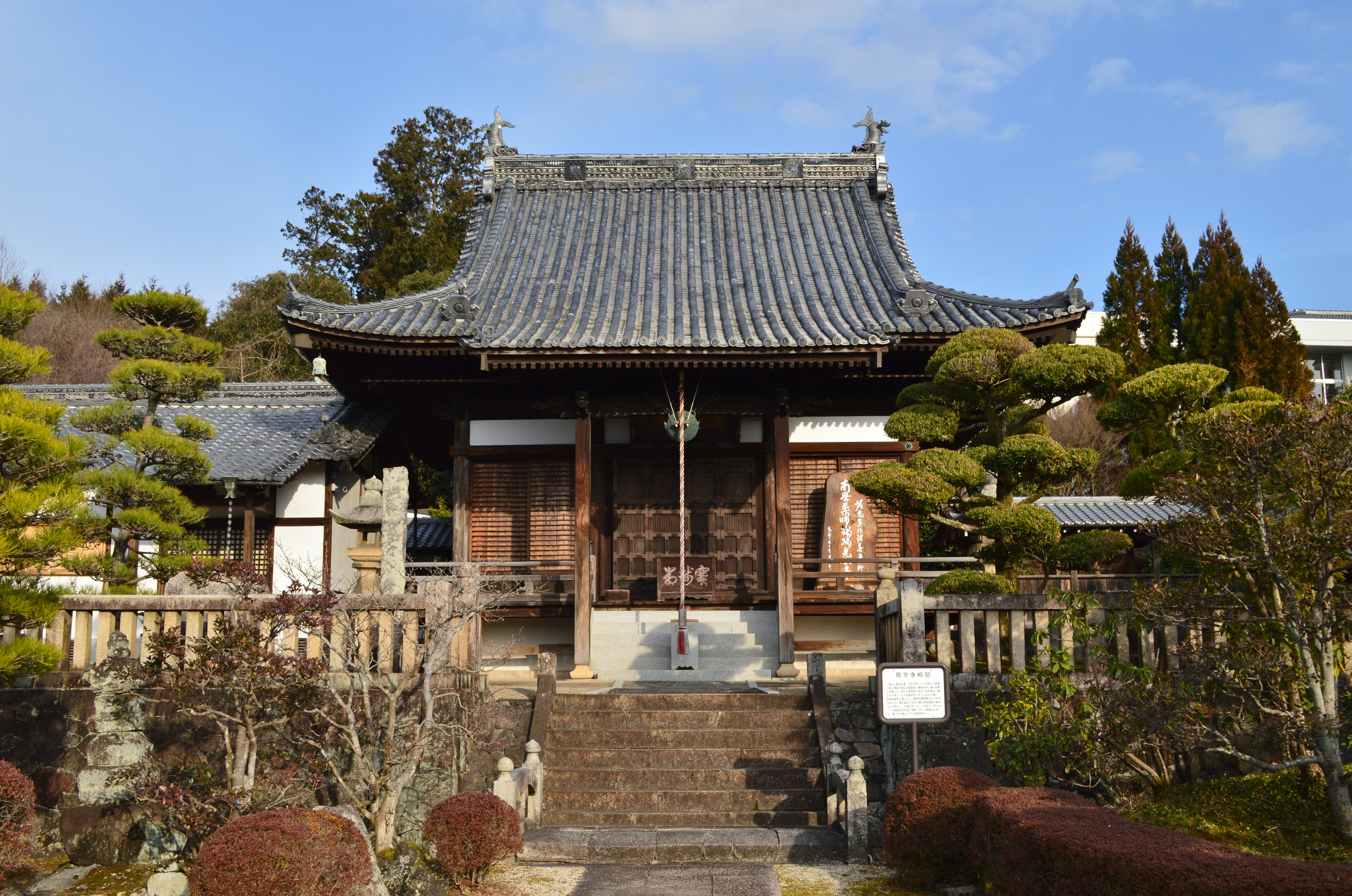
- Mimasaka Kokubun-ji Hondō

- Mimasaka Kokubun-ji Mimasaka Kokubun-ji (Japan)

Religion
- Affiliation: Buddhist
- Deity: Yakushi Nyōrai
- Rite: Tendai

Location
- Location: 483 Kokubunji-chō, Tsuyama-shi, Okayama-ken 708-0843
- Country: Japan
- Interactive map of Mimasaka Kokubun-ji 美作国分寺
- Coordinates: 35°03′00.16″N 134°02′30.76″E

Architecture
- Founder: Emperor Shōmu
- Completed: c.741

Website
- Official website
- National Historic Site of Japan

Mimasaka Kokubun-ji (美作国分寺) is a Tendai sect Buddhist temple in the Kokubunji neighborhood of the city of Tsuyama, Okayama, Japan. Its honzon is a hibutsu statue of Yakushi Nyōrai. The temple claims to be the successor to one of the provincial temples established by Emperor Shōmu during the Nara period (710–794). Due to this connection, the foundation stones of the Nara period temple were designated as a National Historic Site in 2004 with the area under protection expanded in 2009.

== History ==
The Shoku Nihongi records that in 741, as the country recovered from a major smallpox epidemic, Emperor Shōmu ordered that a monastery and nunnery be established in every province, the kokubunji (国分寺). These temples were built to a semi-standardized template, and served both to spread Buddhist orthodoxy to the provinces, and to emphasize the power of the Nara period centralized government under the Ritsuryō system.

The Mimasaka Kokubun-ji ruins are located on a plateau near the Yoshii River in the northeastern part of Okayama Prefecture. The current Mimasaka Kokubun-ji is located on the ruins and foundation stones of the Nara period temple are scattered around its grounds. The Tsuyama City Board of Education conducted a four-year archaeological excavation from 1976 which revealed that the original temple grounds occupied a moated and walled compound approximately 218 meters square. The foundation stones of the South gate, Middle gate, Kondō, Lecture hall and monks quarters are all arranged in a row from south to north, with a cloister connecting the middle gate with the main hall. A pagoda was located in the southeast. This was a typical Kokubunji-style temple layout and from the excavated relics (which included earthenware, roof tiles, and bronze mirrors, it is estimated that the temple was built soon after the imperial edict for the construction of Kokubunji system in 741, and that the temple declined at the end of the Heian period. Among the excavated items, it is particularly noteworthy that the patterns on the eaves tiles from the foundation period are similar to the roof tiles of the Heijō Palace.

According to temple legend, it was destroyed in a fire in the year 1172. The modern temple was built in 1623, when the Mori clan were daimyō of the Tsuyama Domain, and was later reconstructed in 1828 by the Echizen-Matsudaira clan, who had succeeded the Mori clan as rulers of Tsuyama.

The temple is about a 20-minute walk from Higashi-Tsuyama Station on the JR West Kishin Line.

About 450 meters to the west is the site of Mimasaka Kokubun-niji nunnery. As with the Mimasaka Kokubun-ji, it was built in the middle of the 8th century and is believed to have been abandoned at the end of the Heian period or the early Kamakura period. It is not covered by the National Historic Site designation.

== Gallery ==
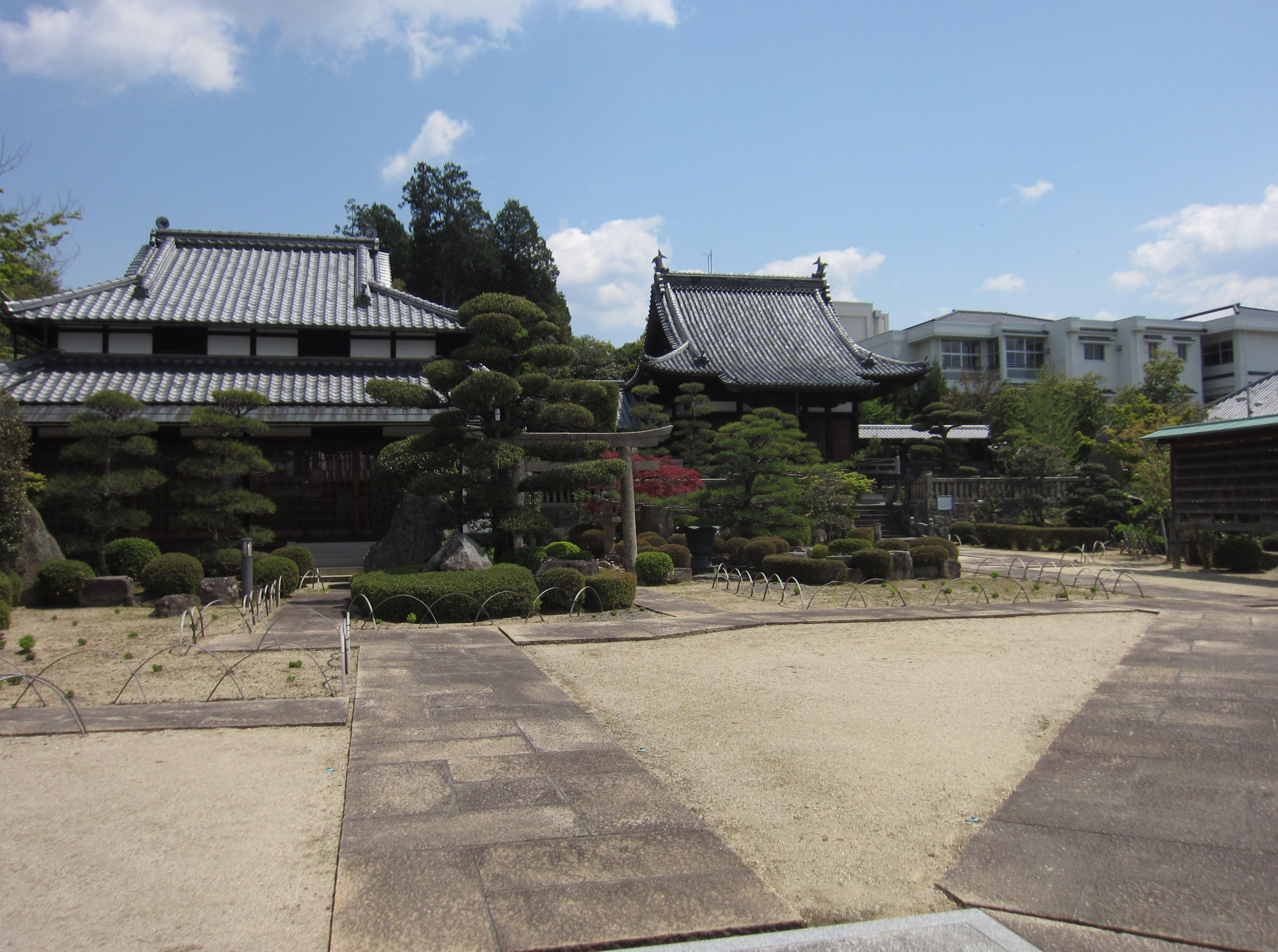
Modern precincts

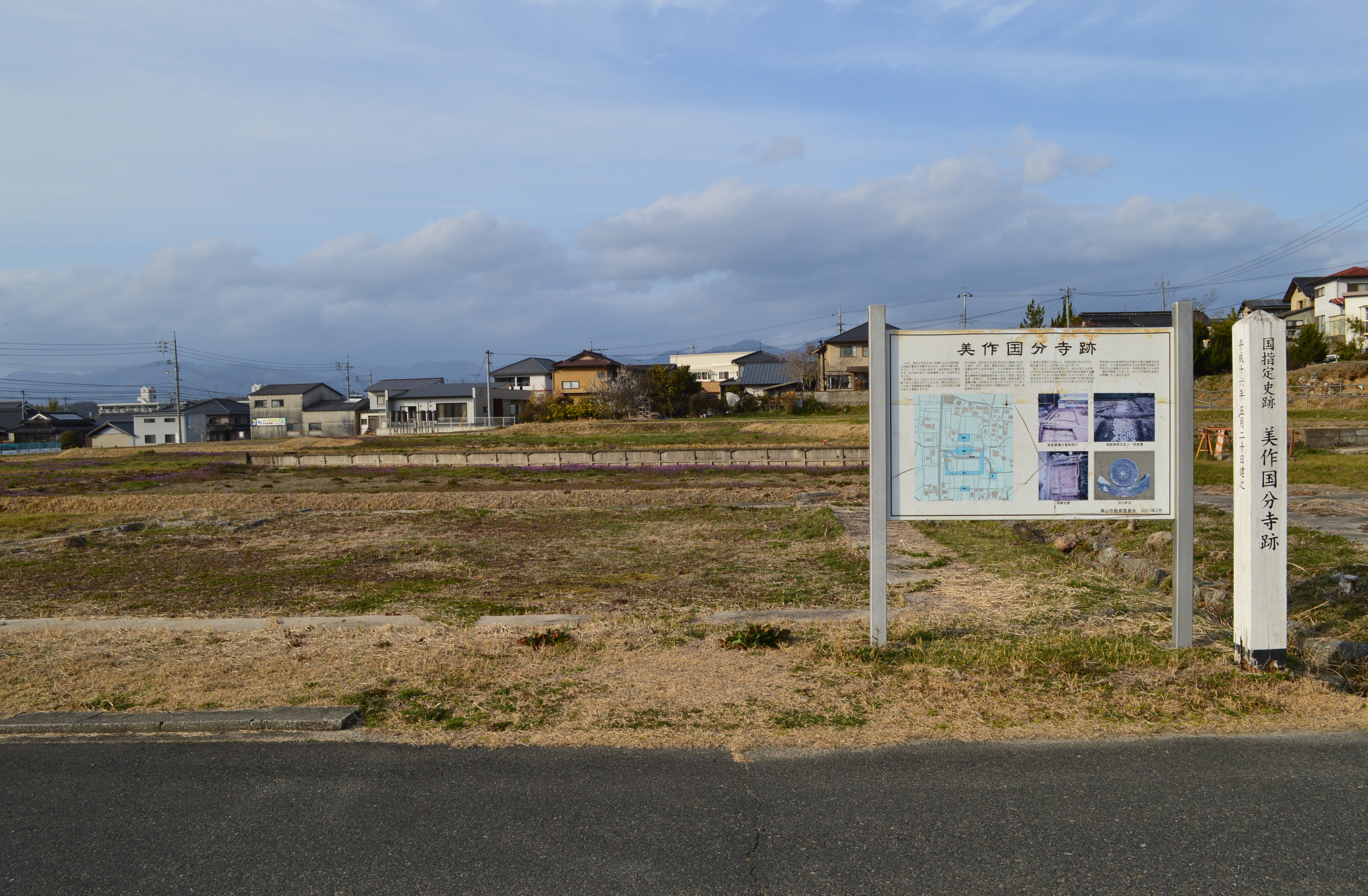
Ruins of the Nara period temple

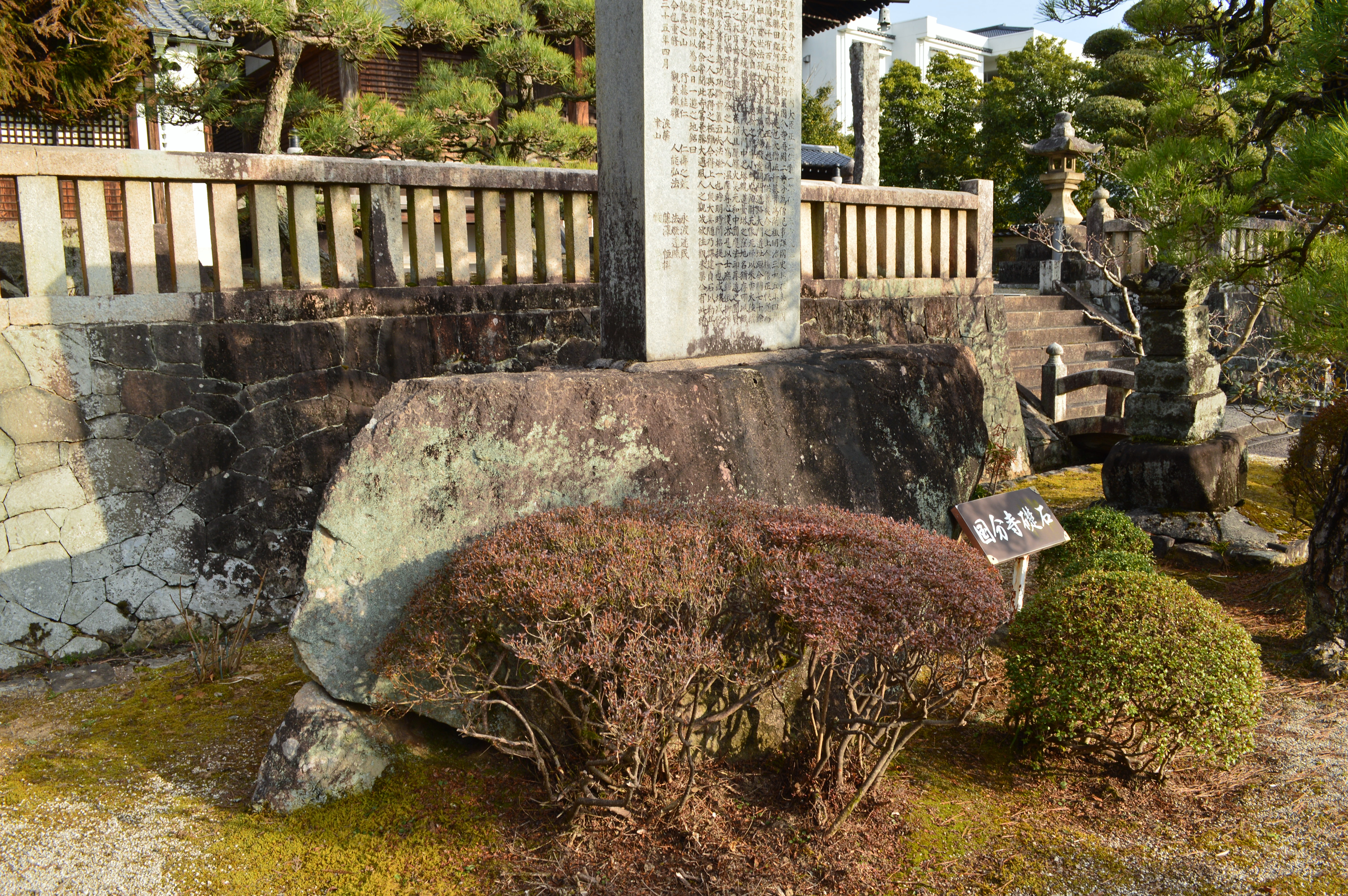
Ancient foundation stone

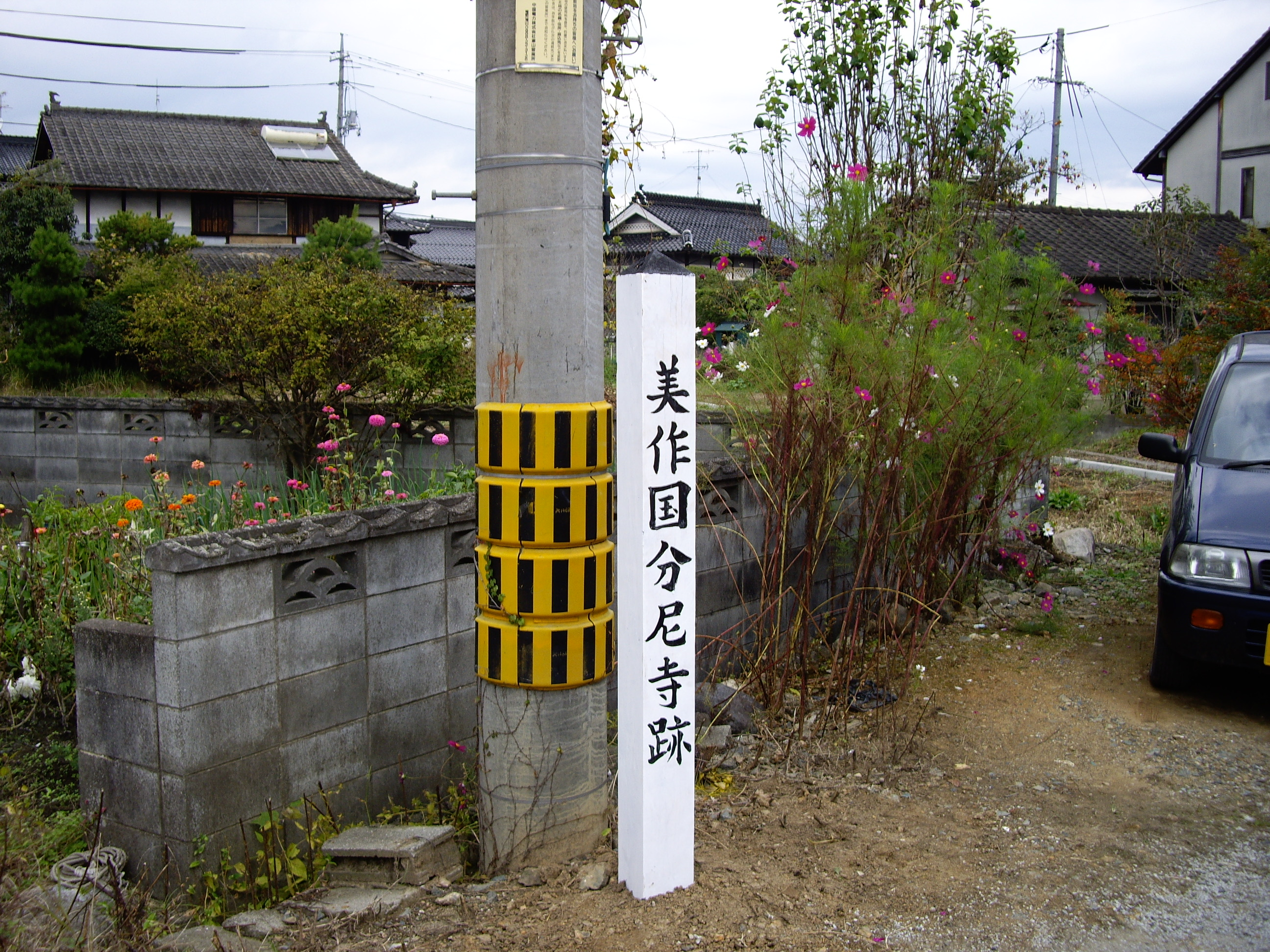
Mimasaka Kokubun-niji site

== See also ==
- List of Historic Sites of Japan (Okayama)
- Provincial temple
