= Takagari Station =

Railway station in Tottori, Tottori Prefecture, Japan

Takagari Station 鷹狩駅
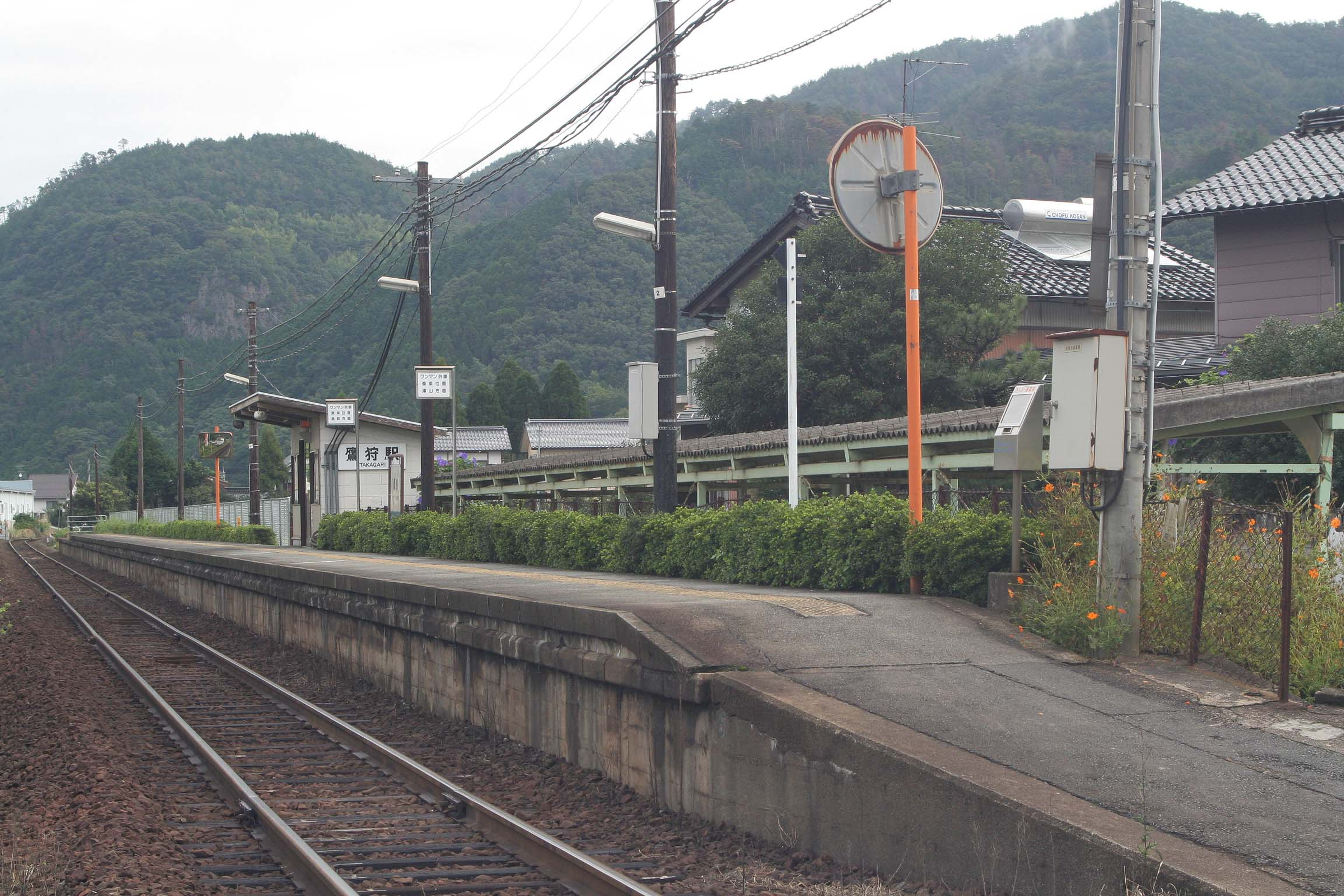
- Takagari Station, 2007

General information
- Location: Mochigasecho, Tottori-shi, Tottori-ken 689-1213; Japan
- Coordinates: 35°21′15.21″N 134°12′22.63″E
- Operator: JR West
- Line: Inbi Line
- Distance: 19.8 km (12.3 miles) from Tottori
- Platforms: 1 side platforms
- Tracks: 1

Construction
- Structure type: At grade

Other information
- Status: Unstaffed
- Website: Official website

History
- Opened: 1 January 1961

Passengers
- 2020: 38 daily

Services
Preceding station	JR West	Following station
Mochigase towards Tsuyama	Inbi Line Local	Kunifusa towards Tottori
Location
- Location within Tottori Prefecture Location within Japan

Takagari Station (鷹狩駅, Takagari-eki) is a passenger railway station located in the city of Tottori, Tottori Prefecture, Japan. It is operated by the West Japan Railway Company (JR West).

== Lines ==
Takagari Station is served by the Inbi Line, and is located 19.8 kilometers from the terminus of the line at Tottori.

== Station layout ==
The station consists of one ground-level side platform serving a single bi-directional track. There is no station building, but only a rain shelter on the platform. The station is unattended.

== History ==
Takagari Station opened on August 1, 1961. With the privatization of the Japan National Railways (JNR) on April 1, 1987, the station came under the aegis of the West Japan Railway Company.

== Passenger statistics ==
In fiscal 2020, the station was used by an average of 38 passengers daily.

== Surrounding area ==
- Japan National Route 53
- Japan National Route 373
- Japan National Route 482

== See also ==
- List of railway stations in Japan
