= Mimasaka-Kamo Station =

Railway station in Tsuyama, Okayama Prefecture, Japan

Mimasaka-Kamo Station 美作加茂駅
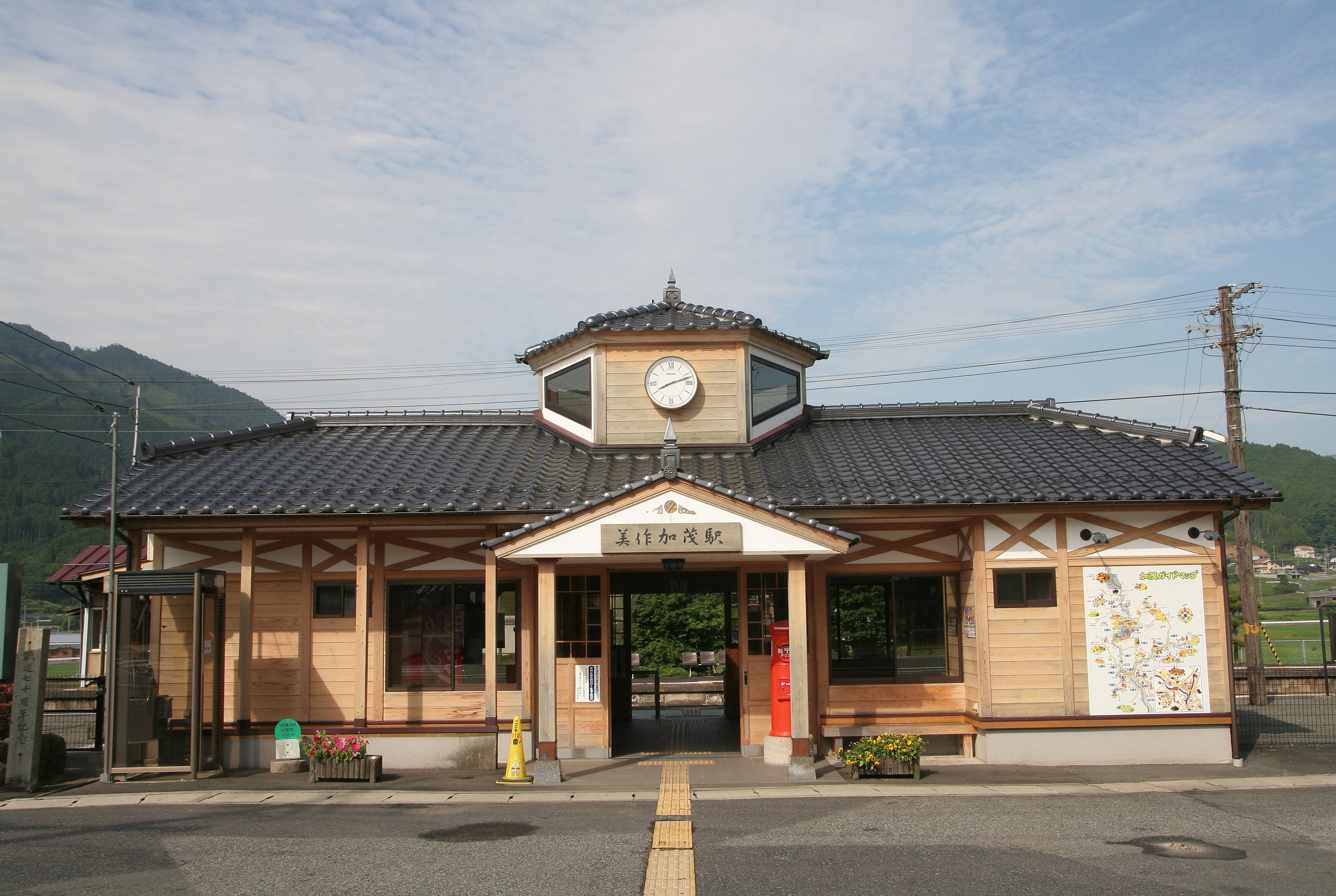
- Mimasaka-Kamo Station, June 2009

General information
- Location: 178 Kamocho Kuwabara, Tsuyama-shi, Okayama-ken 709-3923; Japan
- Coordinates: 35°10′10.32″N 134°3′43.80″E
- Owner: West Japan Railway Company
- Operator: West Japan Railway Company
- Line: B Inbi Line
- Distance: 55.8 km (34.7 miles) from Tottori
- Platforms: 2 side platforms
- Connections: Bus stop

Other information
- Status: Unstaffed
- Website: Official website

History
- Opened: 15 March 1928; 98 years ago

Passengers
- FY2019: 71 daily
Location
- Location within Okayama Prefecture Location within Japan

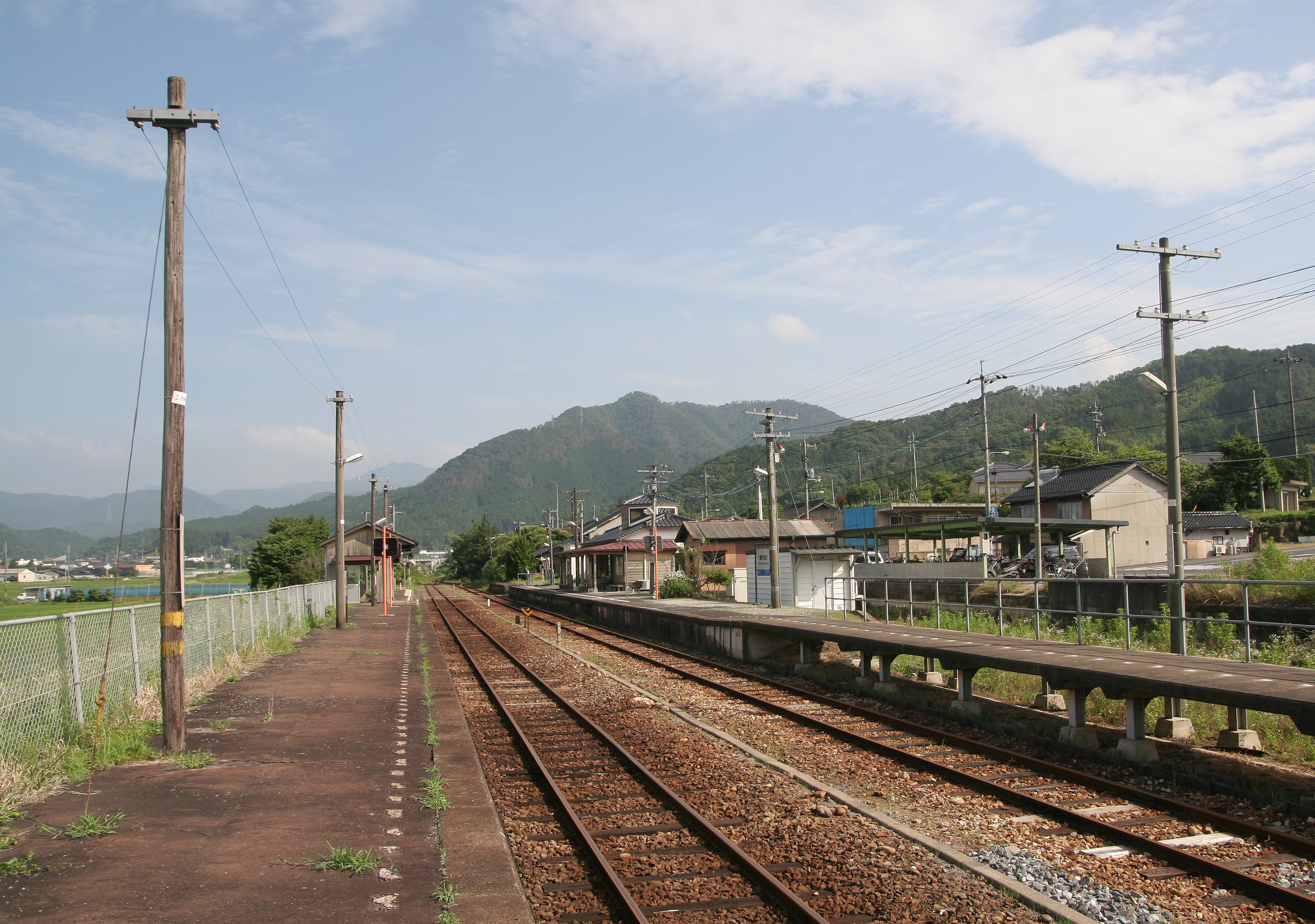
Platforms and tracks

Mimasaka-Kamo Station (美作加茂駅, Mimasaka-Kamo-eki) is a passenger railway station located in the city of Tsuyama, Okayama Prefecture, Japan, operated by West Japan Railway Company (JR West).

== Lines ==
Mimasaka-Kamo Station is served by the Inbi Line, and is located 55.8 kilometers from the southern terminus of the line at Tottori.

== Station layout ==
The station consists of two opposed ground-level side platforms. The station building is located on the side of the platform bound for Tsuyama, and both platforms are connected by a level crossing. The station is unattended.

=== Platforms ===
1	■ B Inbi Line	for Tsuyama
2	■ B Inbi Line	for Chizu, Tottori

== Adjacent stations ==
«	Service	»
JR West Inbi Line
Chiwa	Rapid	Takano
Chiwa	Local	Miura

== History ==
Mimasaka-Kamo Station opened on March 15, 1928. With the privatization of the Japan National Railways (JNR) on April 1, 1987, the station came under the aegis of the West Japan Railway Company. The station building was renovated in June 2003.

== Passenger statistics ==
In fiscal 2019, the station was used by an average of 71 passengers daily.

== Surrounding area ==
- Okayama Prefectural Road/Tottori Prefectural Road No. 6 Tsuyama Chizu Hatto Line
- Tsuyama City Kamo Junior High School
- Tsuyama City Kamo Branch (former Kamo Town Office)

== See also ==
- List of railway stations in Japan
