= Miura Station =

Railway station in Tsuyama, Okayama Prefecture, Japan

Miura Station 三浦駅
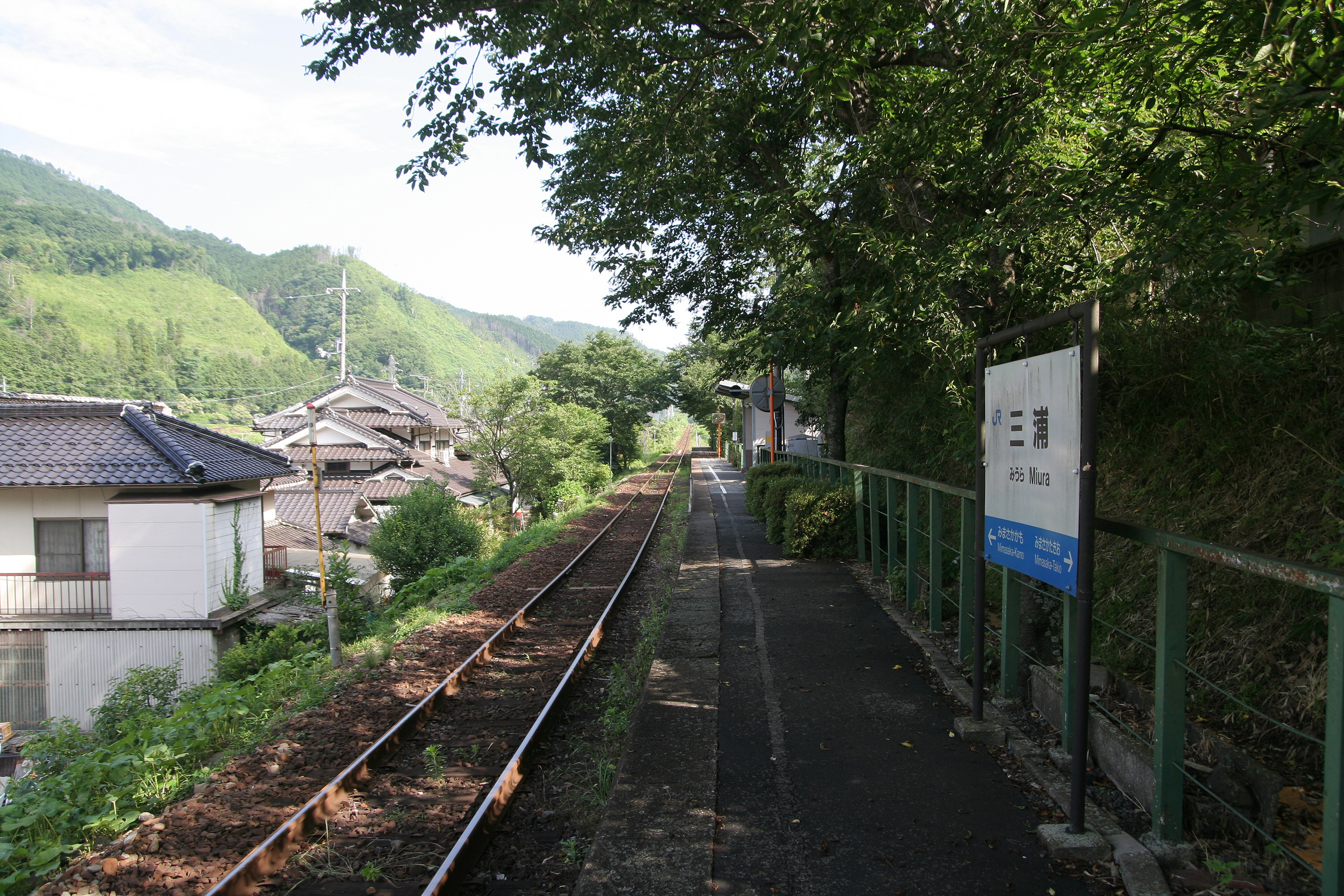
- Miura Station platform, June 2009

General information
- Location: 79 Miura, Tsuyama-shi, Okayama-ken 708-1101; Japan
- Coordinates: 35°8′30.06″N 134°4′40.92″E
- Owner: West Japan Railway Company
- Operator: West Japan Railway Company
- Line: B Inbi Line
- Distance: 59.3 km (36.8 miles) from Tottori
- Platforms: 1 side platform
- Connections: Bus stop

Other information
- Status: Unstaffed
- Website: Official website

History
- Opened: 1 April 1963; 63 years ago

Passengers
- FY2019: 14 daily

Services
Preceding station	JR West	Following station
Mimasaka-Takio towards Tsuyama	Inbi Line Local	Mimasaka-Kamo towards Tottori
Location
- Location within Okayama Prefecture Location within Japan

Miura Station (三浦駅, Miura-eki) is a passenger railway station located in the city of Tsuyama, Okayama Prefecture, Japan, operated by West Japan Railway Company (JR West).

== Lines ==
Miura Station is served by the Inbi Line, and is located 59.3 kilometers from the southern terminus of the line at Tottori.

== Station layout ==
The station consists of one side platform located on an embankment, serving a single bi-directional track. The station is unattended.

== History ==
Miura Station opened on April 1, 1963. With the privatization of the Japan National Railways (JNR) on April 1, 1987, the station came under the aegis of the West Japan Railway Company.

== Passenger statistics ==
In fiscal 2019, the station was used by an average of 14 passengers daily.

== Surrounding area ==
- Okayama Prefectural Road/Tottori Prefectural Road No. 6 Tsuyama Chizu Hatto Line
- Kamo River

== See also ==
- List of railway stations in Japan
