= Chiwa Station =

Railway station in Tsuyama, Okayama Prefecture, Japan

Chiwa Station 知和駅
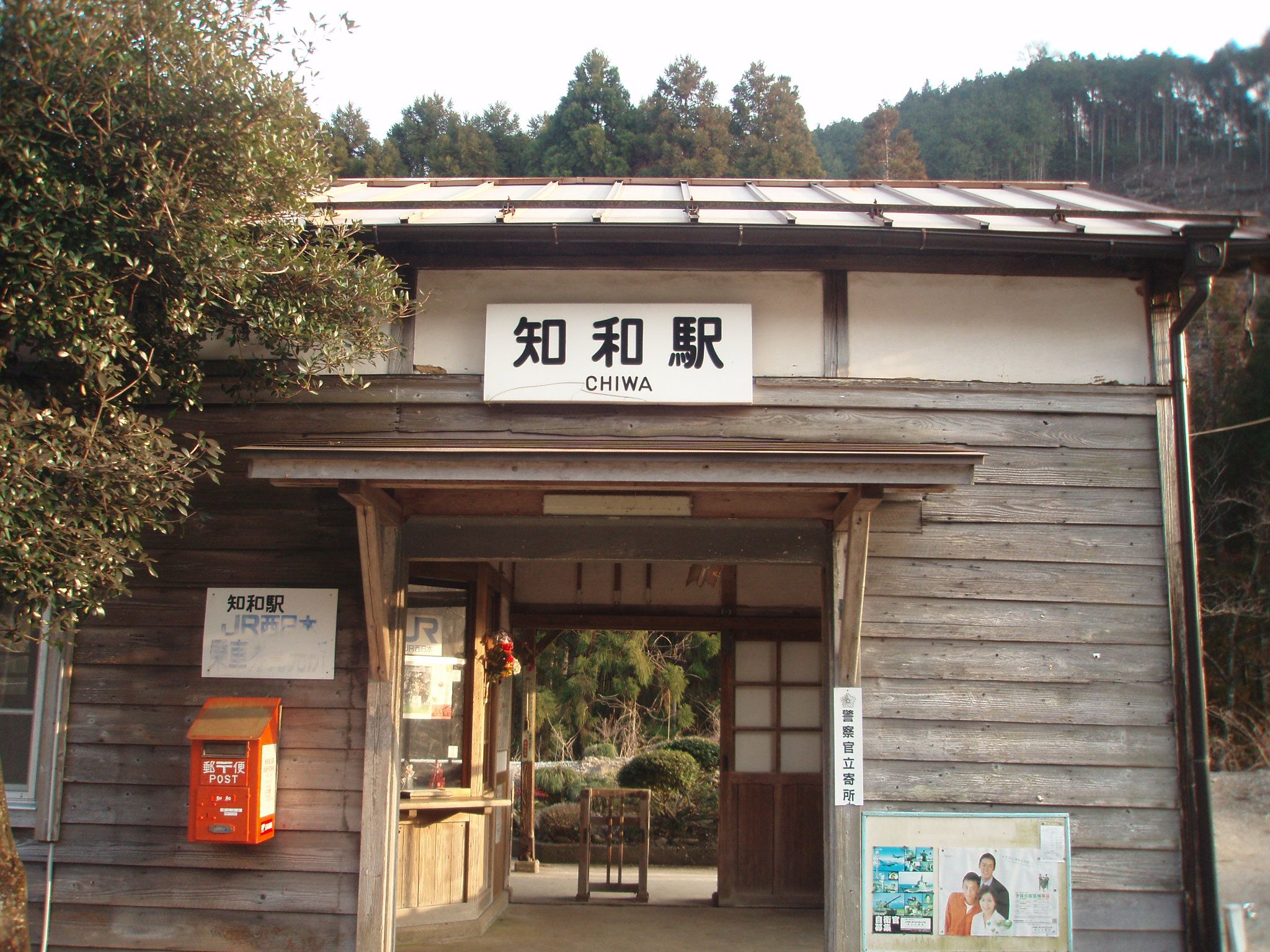
- Chiwa Station, March 2008

General information
- Location: 918.4 Kamocho Kobuchi, Tsuyama-shi, Okayama-ken 709-3924; Japan
- Coordinates: 35°11′33.83″N 134°4′37.60″E
- Owner: West Japan Railway Company
- Operator: West Japan Railway Company
- Line: B Inbi Line
- Distance: 52.0 km (32.3 miles) from Tottori
- Platforms: 1 side platform
- Connections: Bus stop

Other information
- Status: Unstaffed
- Website: Official website

History
- Opened: 12 September 1931; 94 years ago

Passengers
- FY2019: 6 daily
Location
- Location within Okayama Prefecture Location within Japan

Chiwa Station (知和駅, Chiwa-eki) is a passenger railway station located in the city of Tsuyama, Okayama Prefecture, Japan, operated by West Japan Railway Company (JR West).

== Lines ==
Chiwa Station is served by the Inbi Line, and is located 52.0 kilometers from the southern terminus of the line at Tottori.

== Station layout ==
The station consists of one ground-level side platform serving a single bi-directional track. The station building dates from the opening of the station, and the station is unattended.

== Adjacent stations ==
«	Service	»
JR West Inbi Line
Mimasaka-Kawai	Rapid	Mimasaka-Kamo
Mimasaka-Kawai	Local	Mimasaka-Kamo

== History ==
Chiwa Station opened as a provisional station on September 12, 1931. With the privatization of the Japan National Railways (JNR) on April 1, 1987, the station came under the aegis of the West Japan Railway Company.

== Passenger statistics ==
In fiscal 2019, the station was used by an average of 6 passengers daily.

== Surrounding area ==
- Okayama Prefectural Road/Tottori Prefectural Road No. 6 Tsuyama Chizu Hatto Line

== See also ==
- List of railway stations in Japan
