= Mimasaka-Takio Station =

Railway station in Tsuyama, Okayama Prefecture, Japan

Mimasaka-Takio Station 美作滝尾駅
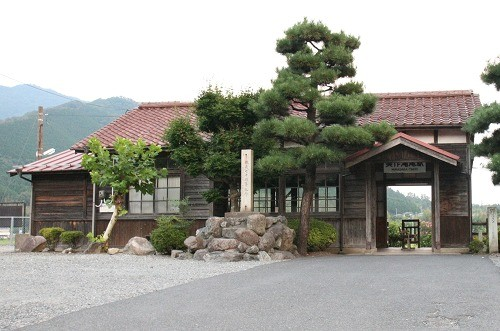
- Mimasaka-Takio Station, August 2007

General information
- Location: 263 Horisaka, Tsuyama-shi, Okayama-ken 708-1103; Japan
- Coordinates: 35°7′25.04″N 134°4′16.77″E
- Owner: West Japan Railway Company
- Operator: West Japan Railway Company
- Line: B Inbi Line
- Distance: 61.5 km (38.2 miles) from Tottori
- Platforms: 1 side platform
- Connections: Bus stop

Other information
- Status: Unstaffed
- Website: Official website

History
- Opened: 15 March 1928; 98 years ago

Passengers
- FY2019: 34 daily

Services
Preceding station	JR West	Following station
Takano towards Tsuyama	Inbi Line Local	Miura towards Tottori
Location
- Location within Okayama Prefecture Location within Japan

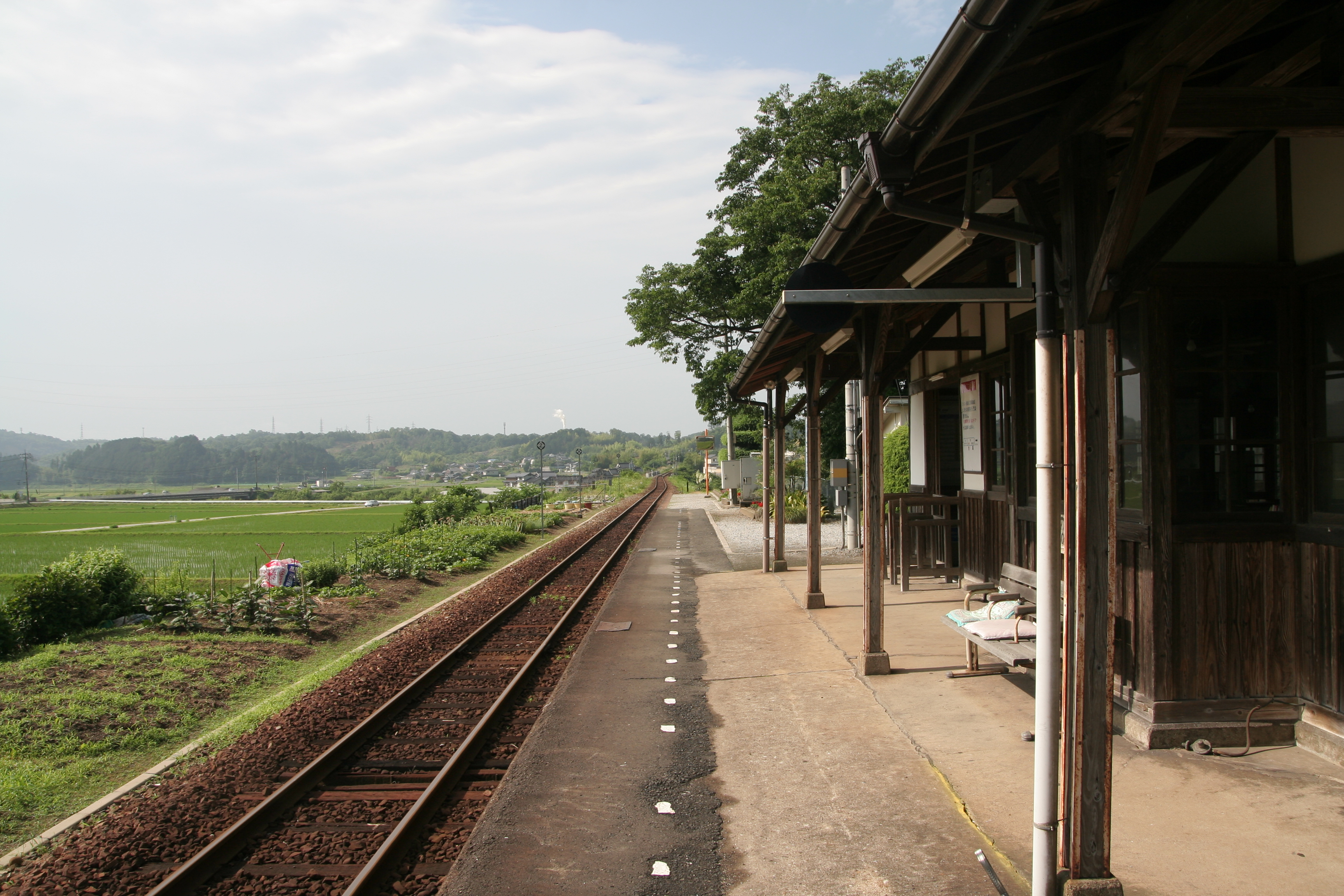
Platform (date.24 June 2009)

Mimasaka-Takio Station (美作滝尾駅, Mimasaka-Takio-eki) is a passenger railway station located in the city of Tsuyama, Okayama Prefecture, Japan, operated by West Japan Railway Company (JR West).

== Lines ==
Mimasaka-Takio Station is served by the Inbi Line, and is located 61.5 kilometers from the southern terminus of the line at Tottori.

== Station layout ==
The station consists of one ground-level side platform serving a single bi-directional track. The station is unattended. The station building, which dates from 1928, received protection by the national government as a Registered Tangible Cultural Property in 2008.

== History ==
Mimasaka-Takio Station opened on 15 March 1928. With the privatization of the Japan National Railways (JNR) on 1 April 1987, the station came under the aegis of the West Japan Railway Company.

== Passenger statistics ==
In fiscal 2019, the station was used by an average of 34 passengers daily.

== Surrounding area ==
- Tsuyama Municipal Seisen Elementary School
- Okayama Prefectural Road/Tottori Prefectural Road No. 6 Tsuyama Chizu Hatto Line
- Okayama Prefectural Route 348 Horisaka Katsuhoku Line

== See also ==
- List of railway stations in Japan
