= Inaba-Yashiro Station =

Railway station in Tottori, Tottori Prefecture, Japan

Inaba-Yashiro Station 因幡社駅
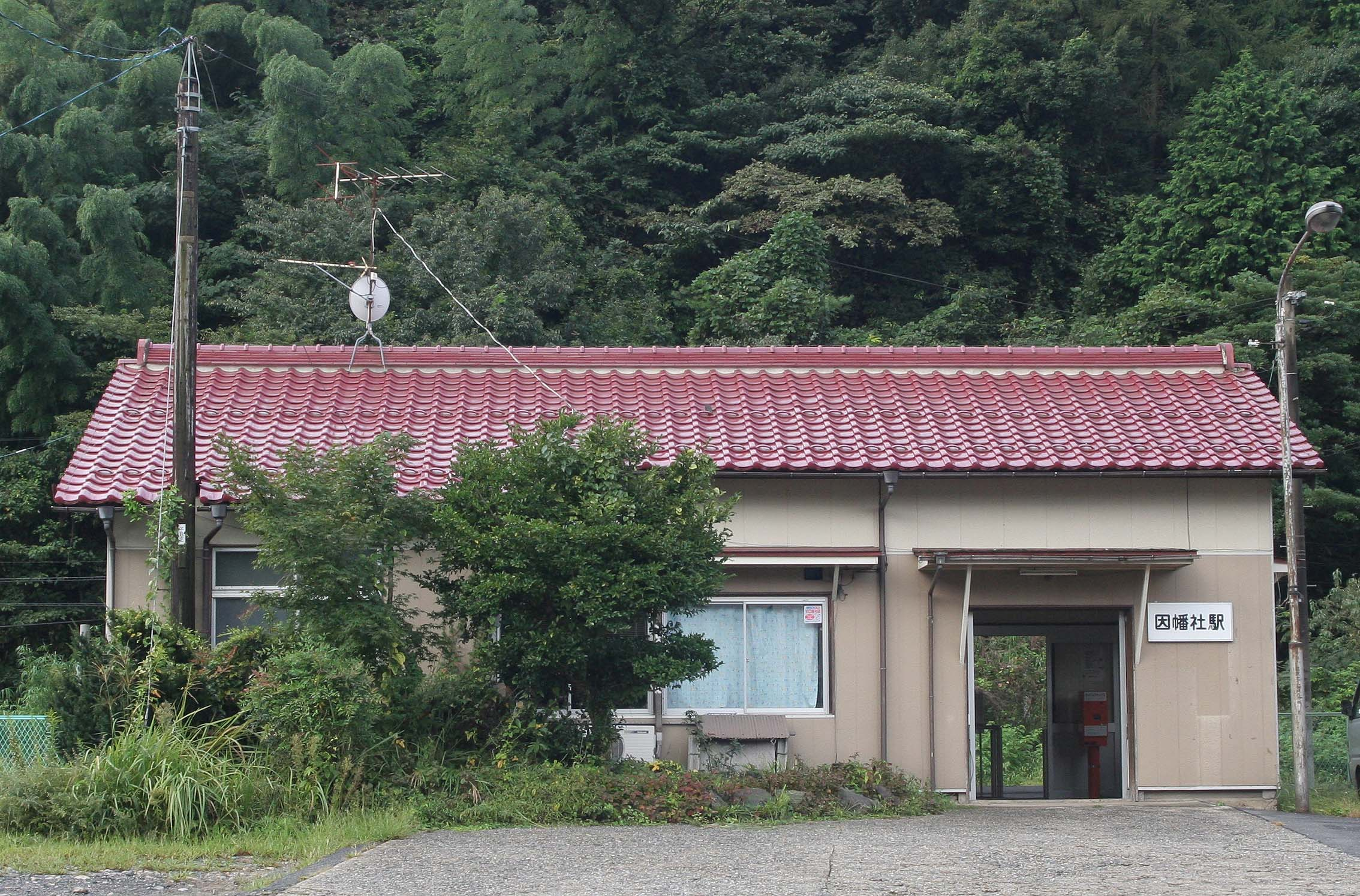
- Inaba-Yashiro Station, October 2007

General information
- Location: Mochigasecho Miyabara, Tottori-shi, Tottori-ken 689-1225; Japan
- Coordinates: 35°18′45.00″N 134°11′47.89″E
- Operator: JR West
- Line: B Inbi Line
- Distance: 24.9 km (15.5 miles) from Tottori
- Platforms: 1 side platform
- Tracks: 1

Construction
- Structure type: At grade

Other information
- Status: Unstaffed
- Website: Official website

History
- Opened: June 5, 1923

Passengers
- 2020: 490 daily

Services
Preceding station	JR West	Following station
Chizu towards Tsuyama	Inbi Line Local	Mochigase towards Tottori
Location
- Location within Tottori Prefecture Location within Japan

Inaba-Yashiro Station (因幡社駅, Inaba-Yashiro-eki) is a passenger railway station located in the city of Tottori, Tottori Prefecture, Japan. It is operated by the West Japan Railway Company (JR West).

== Lines ==
Inaba-Yashiro Station is served by the Inbi Line, and is located 24.9 kilometers from the terminus of the line at Tottori.

== Station layout ==
The station consists of one ground-level side platform serving a single bi-directional track. The wooden station building is on the left side facing the direction of Chizu. The station used to have two opposite side platforms and two tracks, but the track on one side (track 2) has been removed. The station is unattended.

=== Platforms ===
1	■ Inbi Line	for Chizu, Tottori

== History ==
Inaba-Yashiro Station opened on June 5, 1923. With the privatization of the Japan National Railways (JNR) on April 1, 1987, the station came under the aegis of the West Japan Railway Company.

== Passenger statistics ==
In fiscal 2020, the station was used by an average of 14 passengers daily.

== Surrounding area ==
- Japan National Route 53
- Japan National Route 373

== See also ==
- List of railway stations in Japan
