= Kunifusa Station =

Railway station in Tottori, Tottori Prefecture, Japan

Kunifusa Station 国英駅
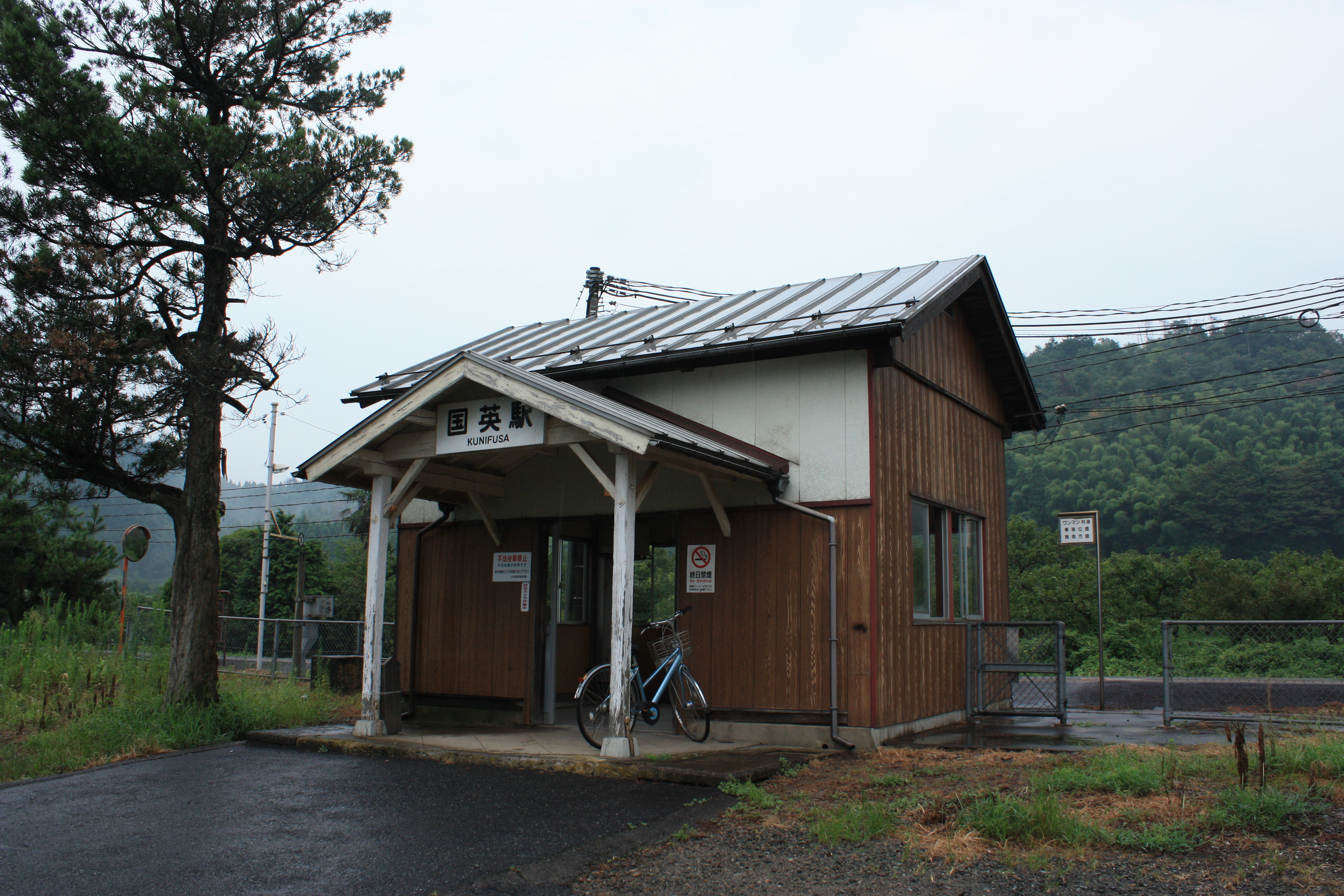
- Kunifusa Station, August 2010

General information
- Location: Kawaharacho Kamakuchi, Tottori-shi, Tottori-ken 680-1216; Japan
- Coordinates: 35°22′22.84″N 134°13′3.84″E
- Operator: JR West
- Line: Inbi Line
- Distance: 17.4 km (10.8 miles) from Tottori
- Platforms: 1 side platform
- Tracks: 1

Construction
- Structure type: At grade

Other information
- Status: Unstaffed
- Website: Official website

History
- Opened: 20 December 1919

Passengers
- 2020: 16 daily

Services
Preceding station	JR West	Following station
Takagari towards Tsuyama	Inbi Line Local	Kawahara towards Tottori
Location
- Location within Tottori Prefecture Location within Japan

Kunifusa Station (国英駅, Kunifusa-eki) is a passenger railway station located in the city of Tottori, Tottori Prefecture, Japan. It is operated by the West Japan Railway Company (JR West).

== Lines ==
Kunifusa Station is served by the Inbi Line, and is located 17.4 kilometers from the terminus of the line at Tottori.

== Station layout ==
The station consists of one ground-level side platform serving a single bidirectional track. The wooden station building was dismantled except for the waiting room portion. The station is unattended.

== History ==
Kunifusa Station opened on December 20, 1919. With the privatization of the Japan National Railways (JNR) on April 1, 1987, the station came under the aegis of the West Japan Railway Company.

== Passenger statistics ==
In fiscal 2020, the station was used by an average of 16 passengers daily.

== Surrounding area ==
- Japan National Route 53
- Japan National Route 373

== See also ==
- List of railway stations in Japan
