= Tsuyama National College of Technology =

Coordinates: 35°04′51″N 134°00′47″E

Tsuyama National Institute of Technology
- Type: Public (National)
- Established: 1963
- President: IWASA Takeshi
- Undergraduates: 847
- Postgraduates: 54
- Location: Tsuyama, Okayama, Okayama, Japan
- Website: Official website (in Japanese)

Tsuyama National Institute of Technology (津山工業高等専門学校,津山高専, Tsuyama Kogyo Koto Senmongakko, Tsuyama Kosen) is a college of technology (kosen) in Tsuyama, Okayama, Japan. The college was founded in 1963.

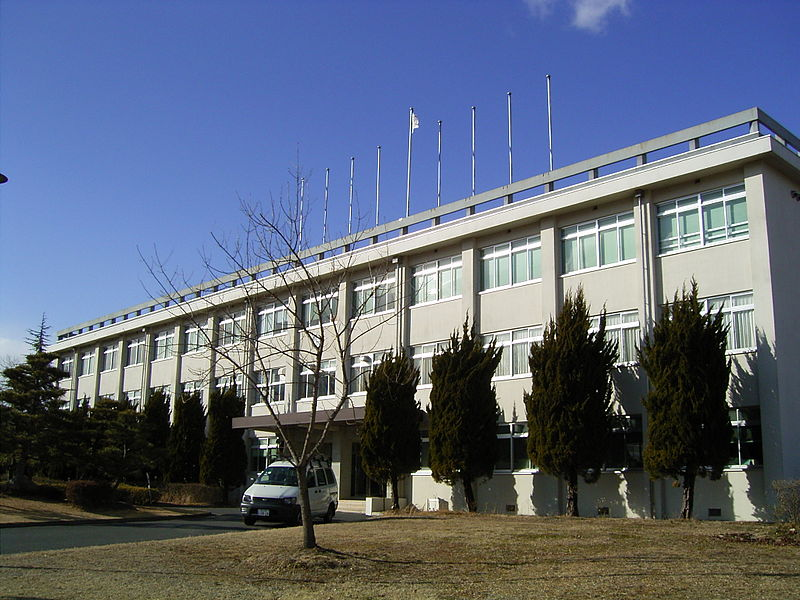
Main campus

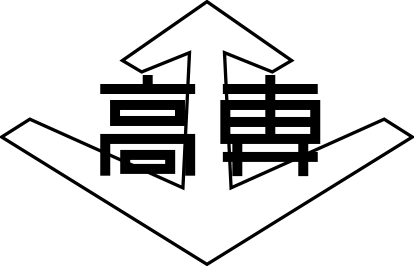
School Symbol

== Institution ==
Tsuyama National Institute of Technology (Tsuyama Technical College), was founded in 1963. The school has sent about 6,300 graduates into the world, who fulfill important positions in industry and society. The five-year system at the college consists of four departments: Mechanical Engineering, Electrical and Electronic Engineering, Electronics and Control Engineering, and Computer and Information Engineering. Each department accepts 40 students per year, and provides technical training at an early age, emphasizing quality and professionalism. The engineering program at this college has been evaluated and accredited by the Japan Accreditation Board for Engineering Education (JABEE). The college’s engineering program thus meets global standards for engineering education. Furthermore, in 2007, this college was accredited by the National Institution for Academic Degrees and University Evaluation.

== Organization ==
=== Main Course ===
- Department of Mechanical Engineering
- Department of Electrical and Electronic Engineering
- Department of Electronics and Control Engineering
- Department of Computer and Information Engineering

=== Advanced Course ( Bachelor Program) ===
- Advanced Mechanical and Control System Engineering
- Advanced Electronics and Information System Engineering
