= Tsuyama =

Tsuyama 津山市
- City
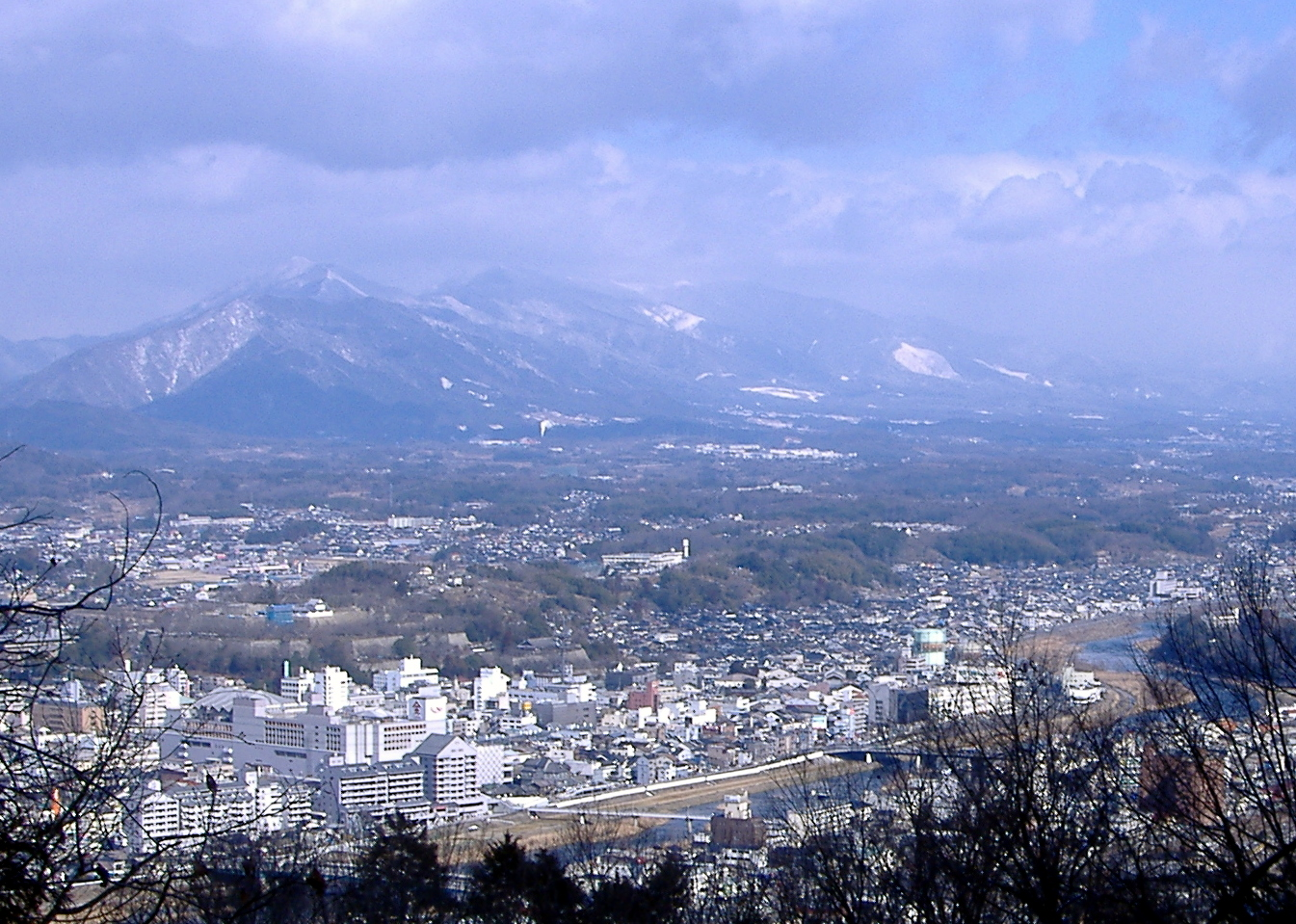
- Tsuyama City

- Flag Seal
- Location of Tsuyama in Okayama Prefecture

- Location in Japan
- Coordinates: 35°04′09″N 134°0′16″E
- Country: Japan
- Region: Chūgoku (San'yō)
- Prefecture: Okayama
- City Settled: February 11, 1929

Government
  - Mayor: Minoru Mitsui (光井聡) - from February 2026

Area
  - Total: 506.33 km^{2} (195.50 sq mi)

Population (February 1, 2023)
  - Total: 97,507
  - Density: 192.58/km^{2} (498.77/sq mi)
- Time zone: UTC+09:00 (JST)
- City hall address: 520 Yamakita, Tsuyama-shi, Okayama-ken 708-8501
- Climate: Cfa
- Website: Official website
- Symbols
- Flower: Satsuki azalea, Sakura
- Tree: Camphor laurel

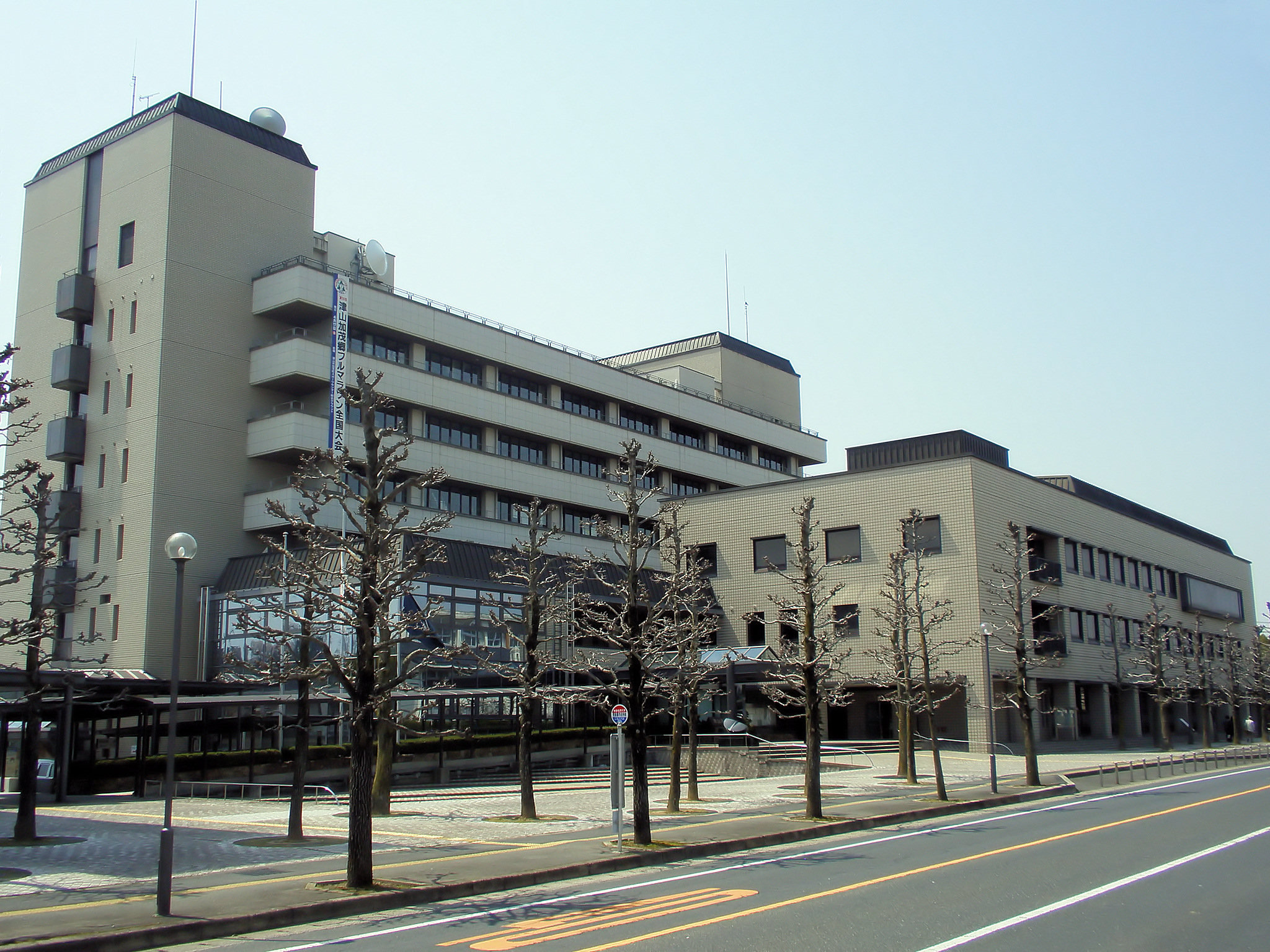
Tsuyama city hall

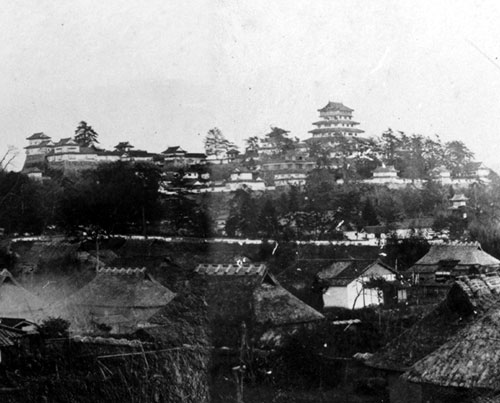
Tsuyama Castle in 1873

Tsuyama (津山市, Tsuyama-shi) is a city in Okayama Prefecture, Japan. In February 2023, the city had an estimated population of 97,507 in 45,653 households and a population density of 190 persons per km^{2}. The total area of the city is 506.33 square kilometres (195.50 sq mi).

== Geography ==
Tsuyama is located in north-central Okayama Prefecture, with the Chugoku Mountains separating it from Tottori Prefecture to the north. It is the largest city in the northern part of the prefecture in terms of population and economy.

=== Adjoining municipalities ===
Okayama Prefecture

- Kagamino
- Maniwa
- Misaki
- Nagi
- Shōō

Tottori Prefecture

- Chizu
- Tottori

=== Climate ===
Tsuyama has a humid subtropical climate (Köppen climate classification Cfa) with very warm summers and cold winters. The average annual temperature in Tsuyama is 13.6 °C. The average annual rainfall is 1,501 mm. September is the wettest month. The temperatures are highest on average in August, at around 25.6 °C, and lowest in January, at around 1.9 °C.

Climate data for Tsuyama (1991−2020 normals, extremes 1943−present)
| Month | Jan | Feb | Mar | Apr | May | Jun | Jul | Aug | Sep | Oct | Nov | Dec | Year |
|---|---|---|---|---|---|---|---|---|---|---|---|---|---|
| Record high °C (°F) | 17.9 (64.2) | 22.5 (72.5) | 26.8 (80.2) | 30.4 (86.7) | 32.9 (91.2) | 36.1 (97.0) | 39.1 (102.4) | 39.2 (102.6) | 36.6 (97.9) | 31.3 (88.3) | 26.3 (79.3) | 19.9 (67.8) | 39.2 (102.6) |
| Mean maximum °C (°F) | 12.8 (55.0) | 16.6 (61.9) | 21.4 (70.5) | 27.4 (81.3) | 30.1 (86.2) | 32.2 (90.0) | 34.7 (94.5) | 35.6 (96.1) | 33.0 (91.4) | 27.8 (82.0) | 21.5 (70.7) | 15.6 (60.1) | 35.9 (96.6) |
| Mean daily maximum °C (°F) | 7.8 (46.0) | 9.2 (48.6) | 13.4 (56.1) | 19.5 (67.1) | 24.2 (75.6) | 26.9 (80.4) | 30.4 (86.7) | 32.0 (89.6) | 27.7 (81.9) | 21.9 (71.4) | 15.7 (60.3) | 9.9 (49.8) | 19.9 (67.8) |
| Daily mean °C (°F) | 2.5 (36.5) | 3.4 (38.1) | 6.8 (44.2) | 12.4 (54.3) | 17.5 (63.5) | 21.5 (70.7) | 25.3 (77.5) | 26.3 (79.3) | 22.2 (72.0) | 16.0 (60.8) | 9.7 (49.5) | 4.5 (40.1) | 14.0 (57.2) |
| Mean daily minimum °C (°F) | −1.4 (29.5) | −1.1 (30.0) | 1.4 (34.5) | 6.1 (43.0) | 11.6 (52.9) | 17.0 (62.6) | 21.6 (70.9) | 22.3 (72.1) | 18.1 (64.6) | 11.2 (52.2) | 5.1 (41.2) | 0.4 (32.7) | 9.4 (48.9) |
| Mean minimum °C (°F) | −5.5 (22.1) | −5.4 (22.3) | −3.5 (25.7) | −0.8 (30.6) | 5.0 (41.0) | 11.4 (52.5) | 17.6 (63.7) | 17.8 (64.0) | 11.7 (53.1) | 4.4 (39.9) | −1.0 (30.2) | −3.6 (25.5) | −6.3 (20.7) |
| Record low °C (°F) | −12.8 (9.0) | −11.1 (12.0) | −9.7 (14.5) | −5.1 (22.8) | −0.6 (30.9) | 6.1 (43.0) | 11.4 (52.5) | 11.4 (52.5) | 5.7 (42.3) | −0.6 (30.9) | −5.5 (22.1) | −8.9 (16.0) | −12.8 (9.0) |
| Average precipitation mm (inches) | 52.2 (2.06) | 59.3 (2.33) | 99.7 (3.93) | 116.1 (4.57) | 148.5 (5.85) | 185.1 (7.29) | 238.3 (9.38) | 127.9 (5.04) | 170.5 (6.71) | 99.0 (3.90) | 60.8 (2.39) | 56.1 (2.21) | 1,416 (55.75) |
| Average snowfall cm (inches) | 18 (7.1) | 16 (6.3) | 2 (0.8) | 0 (0) | 0 (0) | 0 (0) | 0 (0) | 0 (0) | 0 (0) | 0 (0) | 0 (0) | 9 (3.5) | 44 (17) |
| Average precipitation days (≥ 1.0 mm) | 7.2 | 8.5 | 9.7 | 9.4 | 9.9 | 11.5 | 12.4 | 9.0 | 9.7 | 6.9 | 6.6 | 7.2 | 108 |
| Average snowy days (≥ 1 cm) | 4.8 | 4.1 | 0.6 | 0 | 0 | 0 | 0 | 0 | 0 | 0 | 0 | 1.6 | 11.1 |
| Average relative humidity (%) | 79 | 76 | 72 | 69 | 71 | 77 | 81 | 78 | 78 | 79 | 81 | 82 | 77 |
| Mean monthly sunshine hours | 114.9 | 121.3 | 160.2 | 185.3 | 195.7 | 145.0 | 144.5 | 180.2 | 146.6 | 154.1 | 121.1 | 111.5 | 1,779 |
Source: Japan Meteorological Agency

=== Demographics ===
In 2020, Tsuyama's population was 99,937 people. Tsuyama has been conducting censuses since 1950.

Historical population
| Year | Pop. | ±% |
|---|---|---|
| 1950 | 113,575 | — |
| 1955 | 113,938 | +0.3% |
| 1960 | 108,977 | −4.4% |
| 1965 | 103,637 | −4.9% |
| 1970 | 101,015 | −2.5% |
| 1975 | 103,527 | +2.5% |
| 1980 | 106,684 | +3.0% |
| 1985 | 110,542 | +3.6% |
| 1990 | 112,386 | +1.7% |
| 1995 | 113,617 | +1.1% |
| 2000 | 111,499 | −1.9% |
| 2005 | 110,569 | −0.8% |
| 2010 | 106,525 | −3.7% |
| 2015 | 103,746 | −2.6% |
| 2020 | 99,937 | −3.7% |
Tsuyama population statistics

== History ==
Tsuyama was the center of ancient Mimasaka Province and the location of its kokufu and the Mimasaka Kokubun-ji. It was also on the pilgrimage route to Izumo Shrine and had a number of inn stations. In the latter half of the Sengoku period, Mori Ranmaru's younger brother, Mori Tadamasa, received the area as his domain. He constructed Tsuruyama Castle on the site of an ancient castle which had been erected by the Yamana clan, and laid out a new castle town which became the nucleus of the modern city. At the same time, Tsuruyama was renamed "Tsuyama".

Under the Tokugawa Shogunate, Tsuyama Castle was the headquarters of a cadet branch of the Matsudaira clan and the center of Tsuyama Domain. Tsuyama is known for the 17th century Tsuyama Castle, whose grandeur was said to rival that of Himeji Castle in neighboring Hyōgo Prefecture. The castle was destroyed in 1874. Today only the stone foundations remain, except for a single turret that was reconstructed in 2005.

The castle ruins remain Tsuyama's main tourist attraction along with Joto Street, a narrow street of old, traditional buildings that was once part of the pilgrimage route from Kyoto to Izumo, and Shūraku-en, a traditional Japanese garden constructed in 1657. Following the Meiji restoration, the town of Tsuyama was established in June 1889 with the creation of the modern municipalities system. It was raised to city status in February 1929.

In 1938, 31 people died in the Tsuyama massacre, a spree killing.

In February 2005, the town of Kamo, the village of Aba (both from Tomata District), the town of Shōboku (from Katsuta District), and the town of Kume (from Kume District) were merged into Tsuyama.

== Government ==
Tsuyama has a mayor-council form of government with a directly elected mayor and a unicameral city council of 28 members. Tsuyama, collectively with the towns of Kagamino, Nagi and Shōō, contributes four members to the Okayama Prefectural Assembly. In terms of national politics, the city is part of the Okayama 3rd district of the lower house of the Diet of Japan.

== Economy ==
Tsuyama has a mixed economy based on manufacturing, wholesale and retail commerce, and agriculture. The city has several industrial parks.

== Education ==
Tsuyama has 27 public elementary schools and none public junior high school operated by the city government. Four public high schools are operated by the Okayama prefectural Board of Education. There are two private high schools. Mimasaka University and the Tsuyama National College of Technology are both located in the city.

== Transportation ==
Tsuyama's main railway station is Tsuyama Station. The station is served by the Tsuyama Line to Okayama, the Kishin Line to Himeji and Niimi, and the Inbi Line to Tottori. All services are operated by JR West.

Tsuyama is one of the major cities along the Chūgoku Expressway. As with many Japanese cities, cycling is a very common form of transport, particularly among school students.

=== Railway ===
JR West (JR West) - Kishin Line

- Mimasaka-Ōsaki - Higashi-Tsuyama - Tsuyama - Innoshō - Mimasaka-Sendai - Tsuboi

JR West (JR West) - Inbi Line

- Mimasaka-Kawai - Chiwa - Mimasaka-Kamo - Miura - Mimasaka-Takio - Takano - Higashi-Tsuyama

JR West (JR West) - Tsuyama Line

- Sarayama - Tsuyamaguchi - Tsuyama

=== Highways ===
- Chūgoku Expressway
- National Route 53
- National Route 179
- National Route 181
- National Route 374
- National Route 429

== Sister cities ==
- Santa Fe, New Mexico, United States, friendship city since 1999

== Local attractions ==
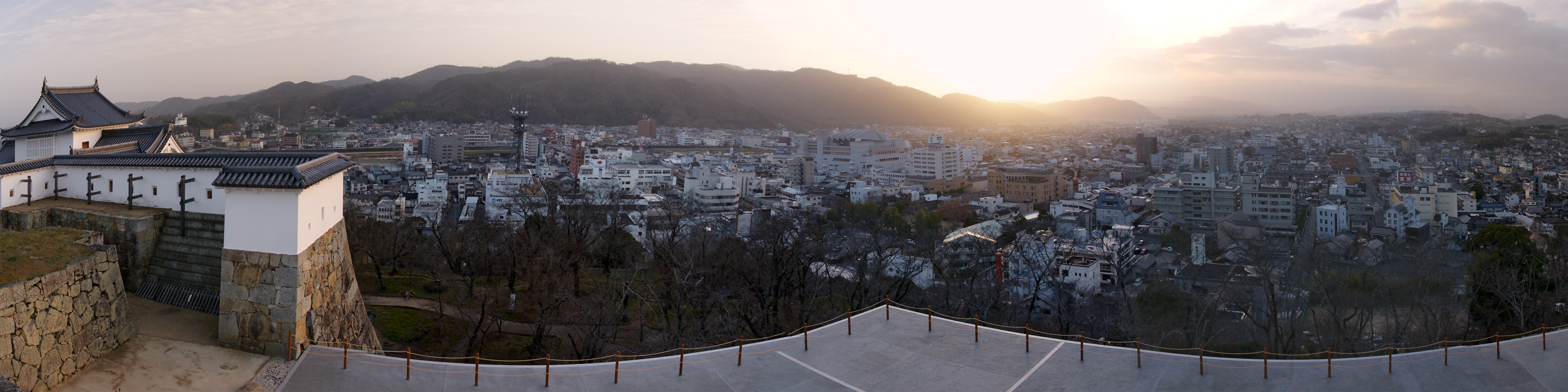
View from Tsuyama Castle

- Mitsukuri Genpo's Former Residence, National Historic Site
- Joto Street, Historic architecture preservation district
- Mimasaka Kokubun-ji ruins, National Historic Site
- Miwayama Kofun Cluster, National Historic Site
- Nakayama Shrine, ichinomiya of Mimasaka Province
- Sakura Shrine (Innoshō-no-yakata site), National Historic Site
- Sannari Kofun, National Historic Site
- Shūraku-en Garden, National Place of Scenic Beauty
- Tsuyama Archives of Western Learning
- Tsuyama Castle, National Historic Site
- Tsuyuma Historical Museum
- Tsuyama Museum of Science Education
- Tsuyama Railroad Educational Museum
- Tsuyama Wonder Museum
- Yokono Falls

=== Festivals ===
- Cherry Blossom Festival (early April) - This event is held in Kakuzan Park where around 5,000 cherry blossom trees attract people from all over western Japan. Many picnickers arrive before dawn and set down blue tarps and then remain until dusk, grilling out and drinking sake.
- Gongo Festival (First Saturday and Sunday of August) - The Gongo, or Kappa, is a fictitious animal said to live in rivers. The festival is based around the legend that the Gongo can be seen in the Yoshii River in summer. Local people congregate on the banks of the river wearing traditional Japanese clothing and eat and drink at the many temporary stalls set up there. The festival culminates in a spectacular firework display on the Sunday evening.
- Tsuyama Autumn Festival (Mid to late October) - Many people parade through the town pulling danjiri.
- Lion Dance Festival (October 17) - The Lion Dance Festival, held at Takata Shrine, began around 710 A.D. to thank the gods for a good harvest. A male and female lion, each controlled by twelve dancers, perform a soul-stirring dance imitating a struggle. The lions keep time with a flute and drum. The dance is believed to drive away the devil and impurity.
- Old Izumo Street Festival (Beginning of November on Sunday) - A festival on Joto Street during which they wear traditional clothes and open a theater, tea houses, and various stalls.

== Notable people from Tsuyama ==
- Koshi Inaba, vocalist of B'z
- Hiranuma Kiichirō, pre World War II right-wing politician
- Yusuke Kodama, professional wrestler
- Joe Odagiri, actor
- Ayane Sakurano, actress
- Kaishū Sano, football player
- Kodai Sano, football player
- Shinji Takahashi, baseball player
- Shun Yashiro, actor
