= Inbi Line =

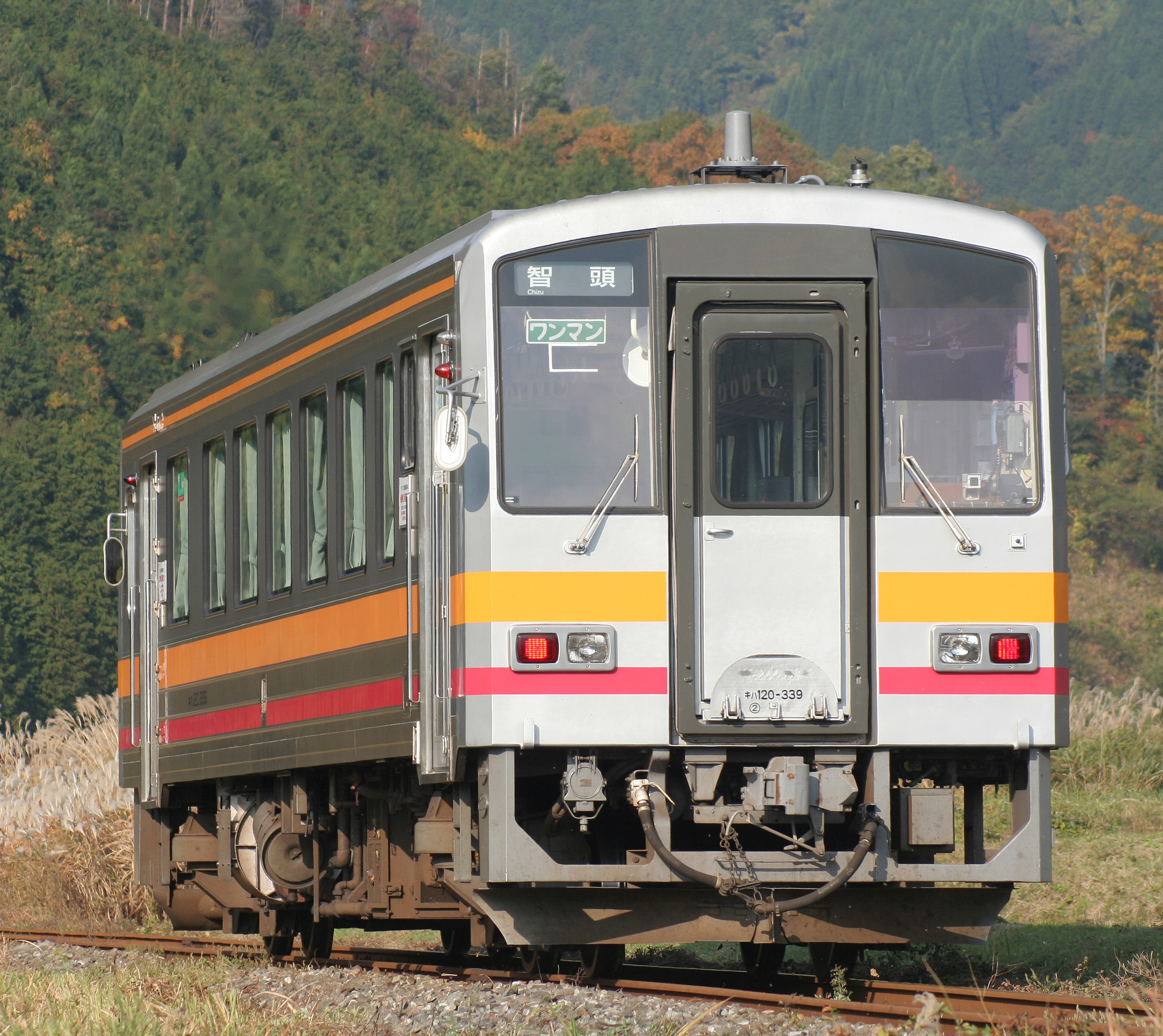
- A JR West KiHa 120 DMU on the Inbi Line

Overview
- Native name: 因美線
- Status: Operational
- Owner: JR West
- Locale: Western Japan
- Termini: Tottori; Higashi-Tsuyama
- Stations: 19

Service
- Type: Regional rail
- Operator(s): JR West
- Rolling stock: KiHa 40 series, KiHa 120 series, KiHa 121/126 series, KiHa 187 series, WT3000 series, WT3300 series, HOT7000 series, HOT3500 series DMU

History
- Opened: 1919

Technical
- Line length: 70.8 km (44.0 mi)
- Number of tracks: Entire line single tracked
- Character: Rural
- Track gauge: 1,067 mm (3 ft 6 in)
- Electrification: None
- Operating speed: 110 km/h (68 mph)

The Inbi Line (因美線, Inbi-sen), sometimes romanized Imbi Line, is a railway line operated by the West Japan Railway Company (JR West) between Tottori, Tottori Prefecture and Tsuyama, Okayama Prefecture, Japan.

== Route data ==
- Operating Company:
  - West Japan Railway Company (Services and tracks)
- Distance:
  - Tottori — Tsuyama: 70.8 km (44.0 mi)
- Gauge: 1,067 mm (3 ft 6 in)
- Stations: 19
- Double-tracking: None
- Electrification: Not electrified
- Railway signalling:
  - Special automatic occlusive (track circuit detection type)

== Stations ==
●: Stop ▲: Some services stop ｜: Pass

Line	Name		Distance (km)	Rapid	Connections	Location	
Imbi	Tottori	鳥取	0.0		Sanin Main Line	Tottori	Tottori
Imbi	Tsunoi	津ノ井	4.3			Tottori	Tottori
Imbi	Higashi-Kōge	東郡家	8.2			Yazu, Yazu District	Tottori
Imbi	Kōge	郡家	10.3		Wakasa Railway Wakasa Line	Yazu, Yazu District	Tottori
Imbi	Kawahara	河原	14.1			Yazu, Yazu District	Tottori
Imbi	Kunifusa	国英	17.4			Tottori	Tottori
Imbi	Takagari	鷹狩	19.8			Tottori	Tottori
Imbi	Mochigase	用瀬	21.1			Tottori	Tottori
Imbi	Inaba-Yashiro	因幡社	24.9			Tottori	Tottori
Imbi	Chizu	智頭	31.9	●	Chizu Express Chizu Line	Chizu, Yazu District	Tottori
Imbi	Haji	土師	35.6	●		Chizu, Yazu District	Tottori
Imbi	Nagi	那岐	38.5	●		Chizu, Yazu District	Tottori
Imbi	Mimasaka-Kawai	美作河井	48.5	▲		Tsuyama	Okayama
Imbi	Chiwa	知和	52.0	▲		Tsuyama	Okayama
Imbi	Mimasaka-Kamo	美作加茂	55.8	●		Tsuyama	Okayama
Imbi	Miura	三浦	59.3	｜		Tsuyama	Okayama
Imbi	Mimasaka-Takio	美作滝尾	61.5	｜		Tsuyama	Okayama
Imbi	Takano	高野	66.7	▲		Tsuyama	Okayama
Imbi	Higashi-Tsuyama	東津山	70.8	●	Kishin Line	Tsuyama	Okayama
Kishin	Higashi-Tsuyama	東津山	70.8	●	Kishin Line	Tsuyama	Okayama
Kishin	Tsuyama	津山	73.4	●	Kishin Line, Tsuyama Line	Tsuyama	Okayama

== Rolling stock ==
=== Local ===
- KiHa 47
- KiHa 120
- KiHa 121 and KiHa 126 series
- Chizu Express HOT3500
- Wakasa Railway WT3000 and WT3300

=== Limited Express ===
- KiHa 187 series (Super Inaba)
- Chizu Express HOT7000 series (Super Hakuto)

== History ==
The Inbi Line was built by the Japanese Government Railway, with the first section opened from Tottori to Mochigase in 1919, extended to Chizu in 1923. The Tsuyama to Mimasaka-Kamo section, opened in 1928, was extended to Mimasaka-Kawai in 1931 and the line was completed with the opening of the section to Chizu (including a 3,077 m tunnel) in 1932.

CTC signalling was commissioned between Tottori and Chizu in 1994.

== See also ==
- List of railway lines in Japan
