= Mimasaka University =

Japanese university

Coordinates: 35°04′38″N 134°00′26″E

Mimasaka University (美作大学, Mimasaka daigaku) is a private university in Tsuyama, Okayama, Japan. The predecessor of the school was founded in 1915. In 1951, it was chartered as a junior college in 1951 and became a women's college in 1967. In 2003 it became a co-ed college.
