= Higashi-Tsuyama Station =

Railway station in Tsuyama, Okayama Prefecture, Japan

Higashi-Tsuyama Station 東津山駅
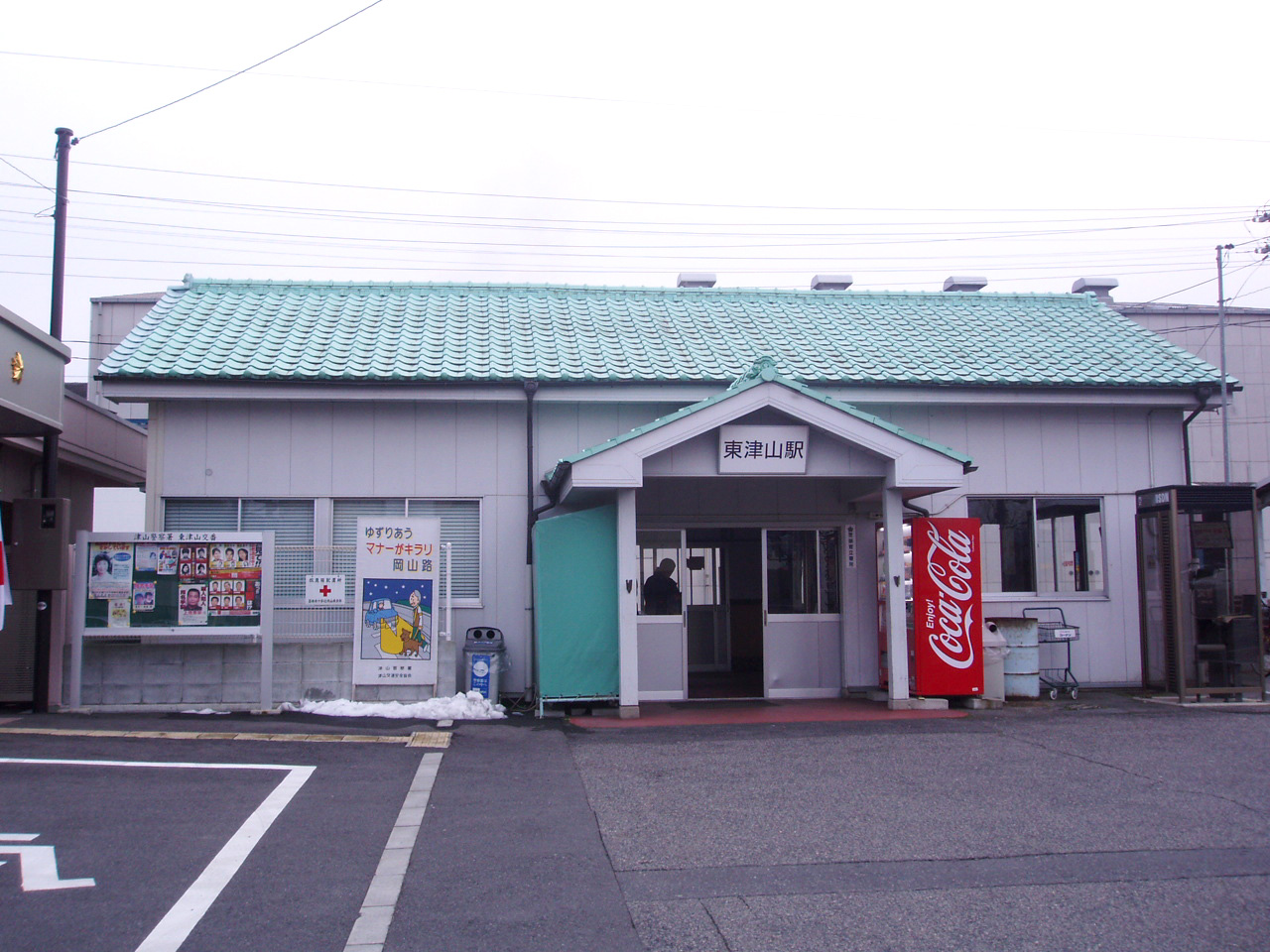
- Higashi-Tsuyama Station, January 2007

General information
- Location: 203 Kawasaki, Tsuyama-shi, Okayama-ken 708-0841; Japan
- Coordinates: 35°3′31.53″N 134°1′53.04″E
- Owner: West Japan Railway Company
- Operator: JR West
- Lines: B Inbi Line; K Kishin Line
- Distance: 70.8 km (44.0 miles) from Tottori; 83.7 km (52.0 miles) from Himeji
- Platforms: 1 side + 1 island platform
- Tracks: 3

Construction
- Structure type: At grade

Other information
- Status: Unstaffed
- Station code: ヒツ
- Website: Official website

History
- Opened: 15 March 1928; 98 years ago

Passengers
- 2018: 118 daily (boarding only)

Services
Preceding station	JR West	Following station
Tsuyama towards Niimi	Kishin Line Local	Mimasaka-Ōsaki towards Himeji
Tsuyama Terminus	Inbi Line Local	Takano towards Tottori
Route map
Location
- Location within Okayama Prefecture Location within Japan

Higashi-Tsuyama Station (東津山駅, Higashi-Tsuyama-eki) is a junction passenger railway station located in the city of Tsuyama, Okayama Prefecture, Japan, operated by West Japan Railway Company (JR West).

== Lines ==
Higashi-Tsuyama Station is served by the Inbi Line, and is located 70.8 kilometers from the southern terminus of the line at Tottori. It is also a station on the Kishin Line and is 83.7 kilometers from the terminus of that line at Himeji

== Station layout ==
The station consists of one ground-level side platform and one ground level island platform serving three tracks. The Kishin Line bound for Sayo and the Inbi Line bound for Chizu stop at Platform 1 adjacent to the station building. Platforms 2 and 3 on the island style are connected by a level crossing, and trains bound for Tsuyama stop at Platform 2. Platform 3 is siding for track maintenance vehicles that are connected only in the Tsuyama direction, and passenger trains do not enter the track. The station is unattended.

=== Platforms ===
1	■ K Kishin Line	for Sayo
1	■ B Inbi Line	for Chizu and Tottori
2	■ K Kishin Line	for Tsuyama and Niimi
2	■ B Inbi Line	for Tsuyama and Niimi

== History ==
Higashi-Tsuyama Station opened on March 15, 1928. With the privatization of the Japan National Railways (JNR) on April 1, 1987, the station came under the aegis of the West Japan Railway Company.

== Passenger statistics ==
In fiscal 2019, the station was used by an average of 116 passengers daily.

== Surrounding area ==
- Yoshii River
- Japan National Route 53
- Tsuyama Central Hospital

== See also ==
- List of railway stations in Japan
