= Tottori Station =

Railway station in Tottori, Tottori Prefecture, Japan

Tottori Station 鳥取駅
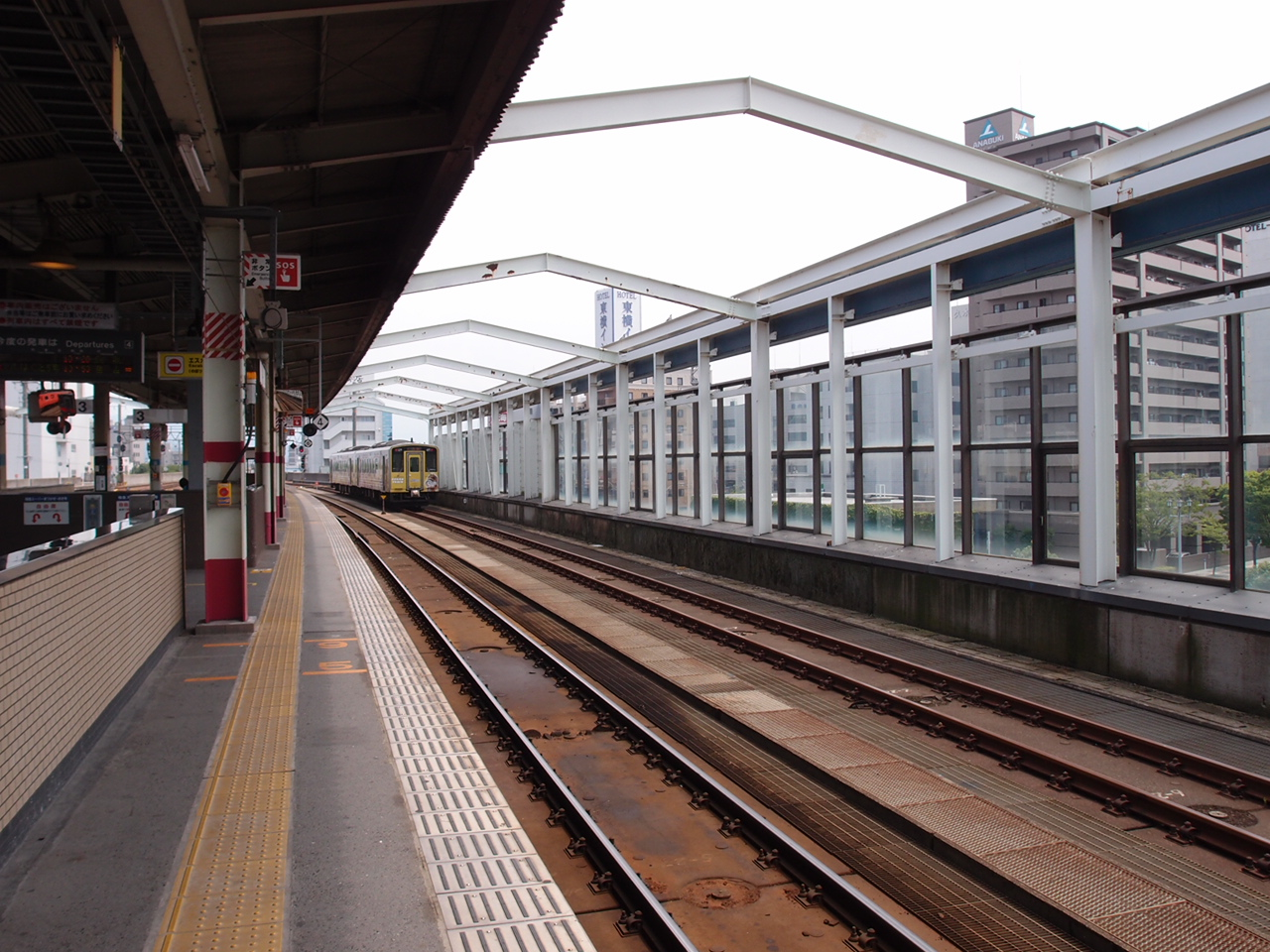
- The platform of Tottori Station

General information
- Location: 111 Higashihonji-chō, Tottori-shi, Tottori-ken 680-0835; Japan
- Coordinates: 35.494316°N 134.225378°E
- Operator: JR West
- Lines: San'in Main Line; Inbi Line
- Distance: 230.3 km (143.1 miles) from Kyoto
- Platforms: 2 island platforms
- Tracks: 4

Construction
- Structure type: Elevated

Other information
- Status: Staffed ("Midori no Madoguchi")
- Website: Official website

History
- Opened: 5 April 1908; 118 years ago

Passengers
- 2020: 3,896 daily

Services
Preceding station	JR West	Following station
Koyama towards Yonago	San'in Line	Fukube towards Kinosaki-Onsen
Tsunoi towards Tsuyama	Inbi Line Local	Terminus
Location
- Location within Tottori Prefecture Location within Japan

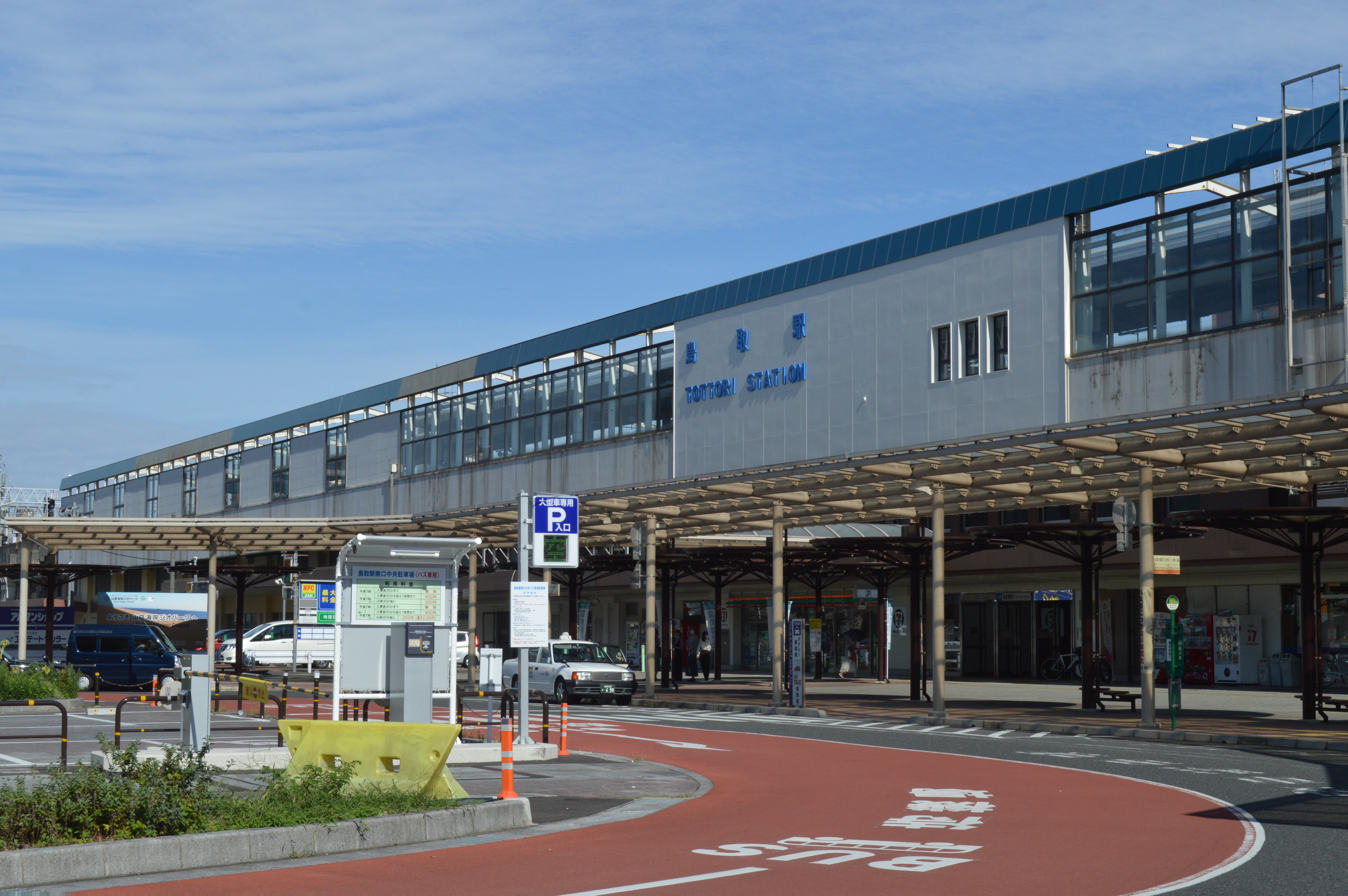
Tottori Station south exit

Tottori Station (鳥取駅, Tottori-eki) is a junction passenger railway station located in the city of Tottori, in Tottori Prefecture, Japan. It is operated by the West Japan Railway Company (JR West). It is located in the Higashihonji-chō district of the city of Tottori.

== Lines ==
Tottori Station is served by the San'in Main Line, with limited express Super Hakuto services to and from Kyoto, Hamakaze services to and from Osaka and Super Inaba services to and from Okayama. It is also served by Super Oki and Super Matsukaze limited express services to and from Masuda and Shin-Yamaguchi via Yonago. It is located 230.3 kilometers from the terminus of the line at Kyoto. Tottori Station is also a terminus of the Inbi Line and is 73.4 kilometers from the opposing terminus at Tsuyama

== Station layout ==
The station has two elevated island platforms serving four tracks located on the third floor of the station building. The station has a "Midori no Madoguchi" staffed ticket office.

Platform No	Line Name	Direction	Notes
1・2	San'in Main Line	for Kurayoshi・Yonago	
1・2	San'in Main Line	for Hamasaka・Toyooka	The Limited Express Hamakaze departs from Track 1
1・2	Inbi Line	for Kōge]・Tsuyama・Osaka	Kyoto bound Limited Express Super Hakuto services depart from Track 1
3	San'in Main Line	for Kurayoshi and Yonago	
3	San'in Main Line	for Hamasaka and Tottori	Local Trains leave from this track
3	Inbi Line	for Kōge, Tsuyama, and Osaka	
4	San'in Main Line	for Kurayoshi and Yonago	It isn't possible to arrive and depart on the Sanin Line going toward Hamasaka because the tracks arent connected.
4	Inbi Line	for Kōge, Tsuyama, and Osaka	

== Adjacent stations ==
West Japan Railway Company (JR West)

«	Service	»
Sanin Main Line
Limited Express Super Oki: Does not stop at this station
Limited Express Super Matsukaze: Does not stop at this station
Koyama	Express "Tottori Liner"	Terminus
Fukube	Local	Koyama
Inbi Line
Terminus	Local	Tsunoi

== History ==
Tottori Station opened on 5 April 1908. With the privatization of JNR on 1 April 1987, the station came under the control of JR West.

== Passenger statistics ==
In fiscal 2020, the station was used by an average of 3,896 passengers daily.

== Surrounding area ==
- Tottori City Hall
- Tottori Sand Dunes

== See also ==
- List of railway stations in Japan
