= Akebono =

Akebono is a Japanese word meaning dawn or the color of the sky at dawn. It may refer to:

== Science ==
- Akebono (fly), a fly genus in the family Sciomyzidae or Phaeomyiidae
- Akebono (satellite), a magnetosphere observation satellite

== Ships ==
- Akebono Maru, several ships
- Japanese destroyer Akebono, several ships of the Imperial Japanese Navy and the Japanese Maritime Self-Defense Force

== Other uses ==
- Akebono (train), a sleeping-car train in Japan
- Akebono Brake Industry, a Japanese manufacturer
- Akebono scale, a common scale used in Japanese music
- Akebono Tarō (1969–2024), sumo wrestler and professional wrestler
- Kimura Akebono (1872–1890), Japanese novelist
