= Mitsukuri Genpo =

Japanese doctor

- 箕作阮甫
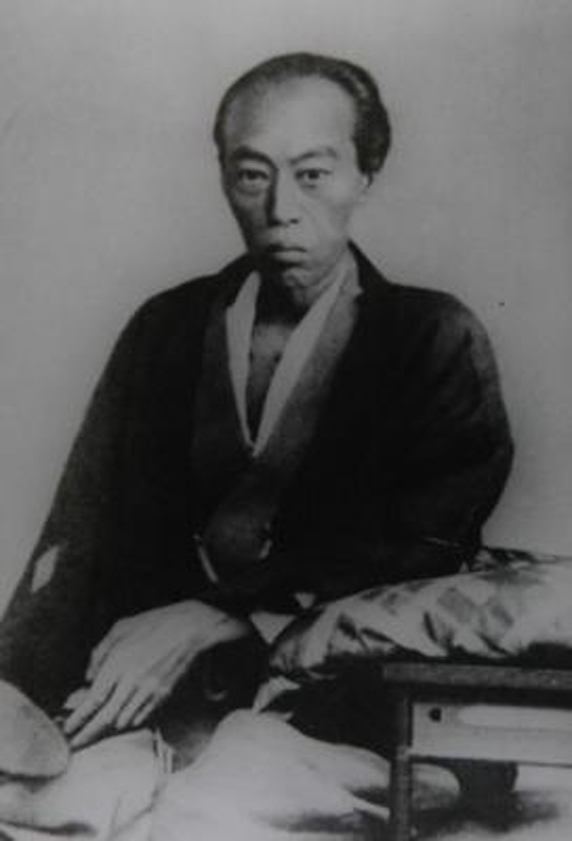
- Mitsukuri Genpo, c.1863
- Born: Mitsukuri Teiichi; October 5, 1799; Tsuyama, Mimasaka Province, Tokugawa Shogunate
- Died: August 1, 1863 (aged 63); Edo, Tokugawa Shogunate

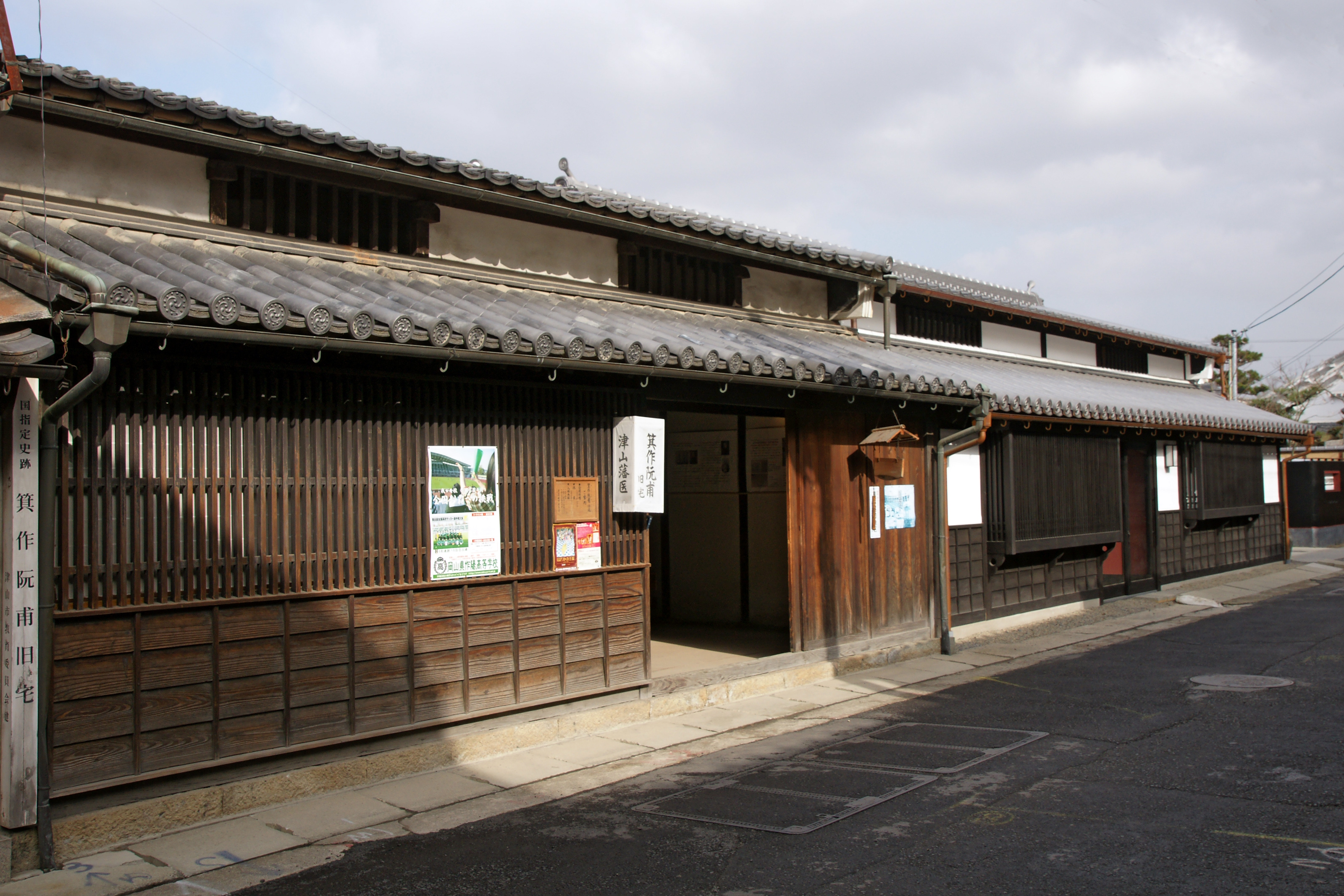
Former Genpo Mitsukuri House in Tsuyama

Mitsukuri Genpo (箕作阮甫; October 5, 1799 – August 1, 1863) was a samurai, medical doctor, rangaku scholar, author and translator working for Tsuyama Domain during late Edo Period Japan. His given name was Teiichi.

== Biography ==
Mitsukuri Genpo was born in what is now the Nishishinmachi neighborhood of the city of Tsuyama, Okayama. He was the third child of the clan doctor to Tsuyama Domain, Mitsukuri Sadayoshi; however, his father died when Genpo was age 4, and his elder brother died when Genpo was age 12, making him heir to the family estate. After studying Confucianism and astronomy at the han school, he was sent to Kyoto for three years of medical studies in 1816. In 1819, after his return to Tsuyama, he opened a clinic and married the following year. He was granted a stipend of 50 koku by Tsuyama Domain and a staff of ten assistants. In 1823, he was ordered to accompany the daimyo Matsudaira Naritaka to Edo. He then studied western medicine in Edo under Udagawa Genshin (1769–1834). In 1834 he opened a training center in Edo, but fires and failing health led him to turn to translation. In 1839, he became the official translator from Dutch at the Observatory of the Shogunate government. He was asked to assist in negotiations involving Russian admiral Yevfimiy Putyatin's visit to Nagasaki in 1853, and later translated the letter by United States president Millard Fillmore brought to Japan by the Perry Expedition demanding an end to Japan's national isolation policy and opening to foreign trade. The following year he participated in the negotiations with the Americans that led to the signing of the Treaty of Kanagawa.

In 1856, Gempo became an instructor at the newly established Bansho Shirabesho, established by the Tokugawa shogunate. Gempo was a prolific author and translator, writing Japan's first medical magazine "Taisei Meiko", and more than 160 books covering a wide range of fields such as medicine, languages, Western history, military science, and religious studies. In 1862, he became a hatamoto of the shogunate. He died in Edo in 1863 and his grave is now at the Tama Cemetery.

Genpo's birthplace still exists in Nishishinmachi, Tsuyama and is preserved as a museum. It retains the appearance of a merchant house from the Edo period, and was designated as a National Historic Site in 1975.

== See also ==
- List of Historic Sites of Japan (Okayama)
