= Kutsumi Tsuneo =

Japanese Rear-Admiral (1866–1943)

Rear-Admiral Kutsumi Tsuneo
- 九津見雅雄
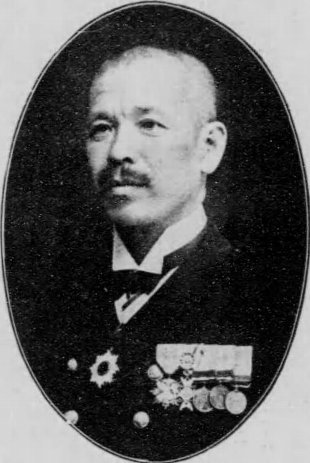
- Born: December 22, 1866; Maniwa, Katsuyama Domain, Tokugawa
- Died: July 25, 1943 (aged 76)
- Education: Imperial Japanese Naval Academy
- Military career
- Allegiance: Japan
- Branch: Imperial Japanese Navy
- Service years: 1889 – 1927
- Rank: Rear-Admiral
- Unit: 1st Fleet
- Commands: Ariake
- Conflicts: First Sino-Japanese War; Russo-Japanese War; Battle of Tsushima

Kutsumi Tsuneo (九津見雅雄, Kutsumi Tsuneo; December 22, 1866 – July 25, 1943) was a rear admiral in the Imperial Japanese navy. He commanded the Destroyer Ariake and participated in the Battle of Tsushima during the Russo-Japanese War.

== Biography ==
Kutsumi was born on December 22, 1866, at Maniwa, Katsuyama Domain. He graduated from the Imperial Japanese Naval Academy as part of its 15th class and served on the Kongō as an ensign. In April 1894, he was a navigator at the Chōkai and participated in the First Sino-Japanese War. Afterwards, he served at the Sasebo Naval District and as the captain of the Yoshino and the Akebono. During the Russo-Japanese War, he participated at the Battle of Tsushima as part of the 1st Fleet while commanding the Ariake. He managed to sink the Russian destroyer Bezuprechny with assistance from the Chitose. He was promoted to captain and given command of the corvette Katsuragi in 1910. He was promoted to rear admiral in December 1918 and retired in 1927.

== Court Titles ==
- Senior Eighth Rank (December 14, 1891)
- Junior Seventh Rank (March 8, 1898)
