= Sakura Shrine =

Shinto shrine in Okayama Prefecture, Japan

Sakura Shrine 作楽神社
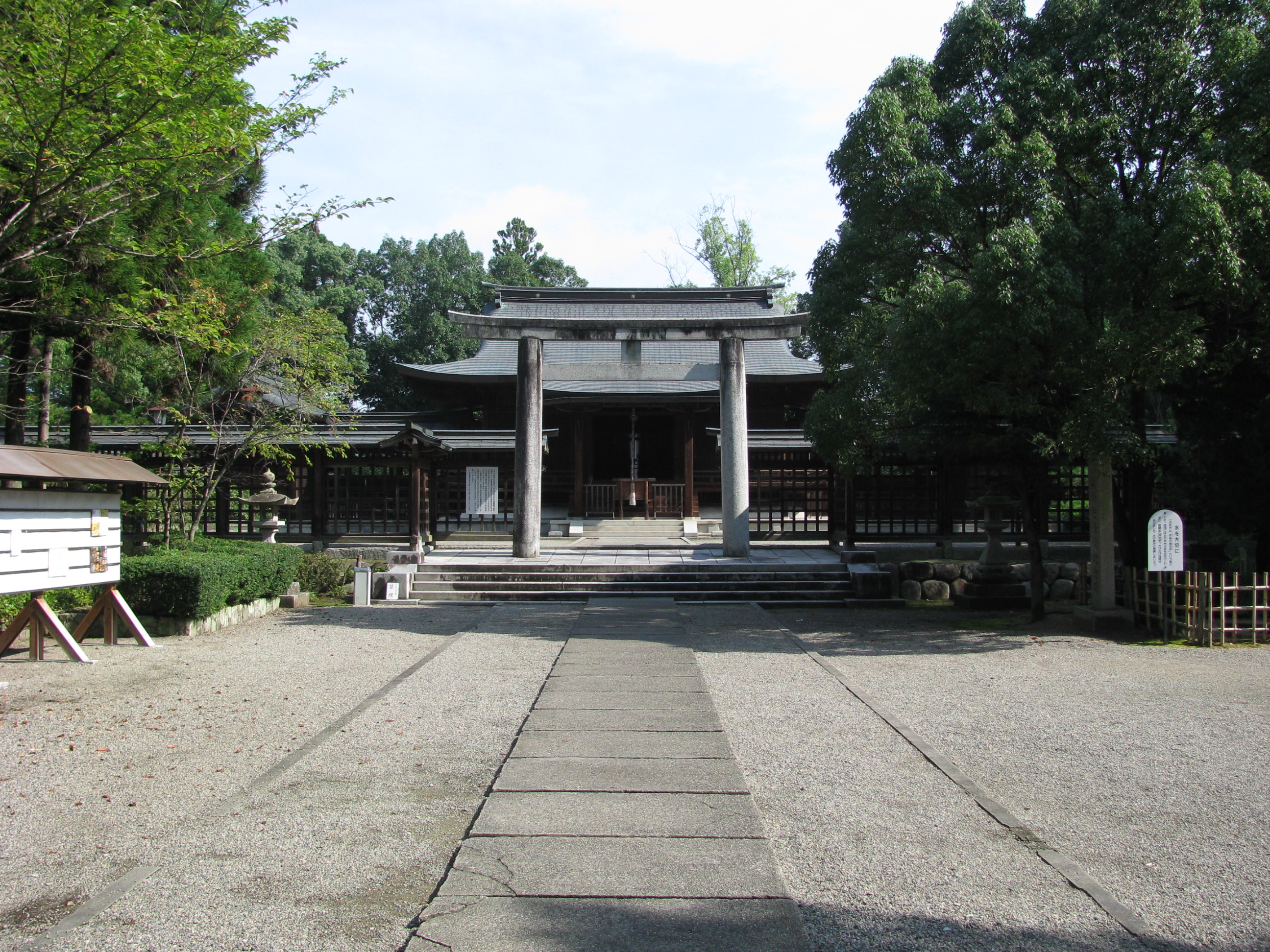
- Approach to Sakura Jinja

- Location within Okayama Prefecture Location within Japan

Religion
- Affiliation: Shinto
- Deity: Emperor Go-Daigo, Kojima Takanori
- Festival: 2nd Sunday in April

Location
- Location: 433 Jingo, Tsuyama-shi, Okayama-ken 708-0015
- Interactive map of Sakura Shrine 作楽神社
- Coordinates: 35°3′44″N 133°56′35″E

Architecture
- Style: Shimmei-zukuri
- Founder: Matsudaira Yoshitomo
- Established: 1869

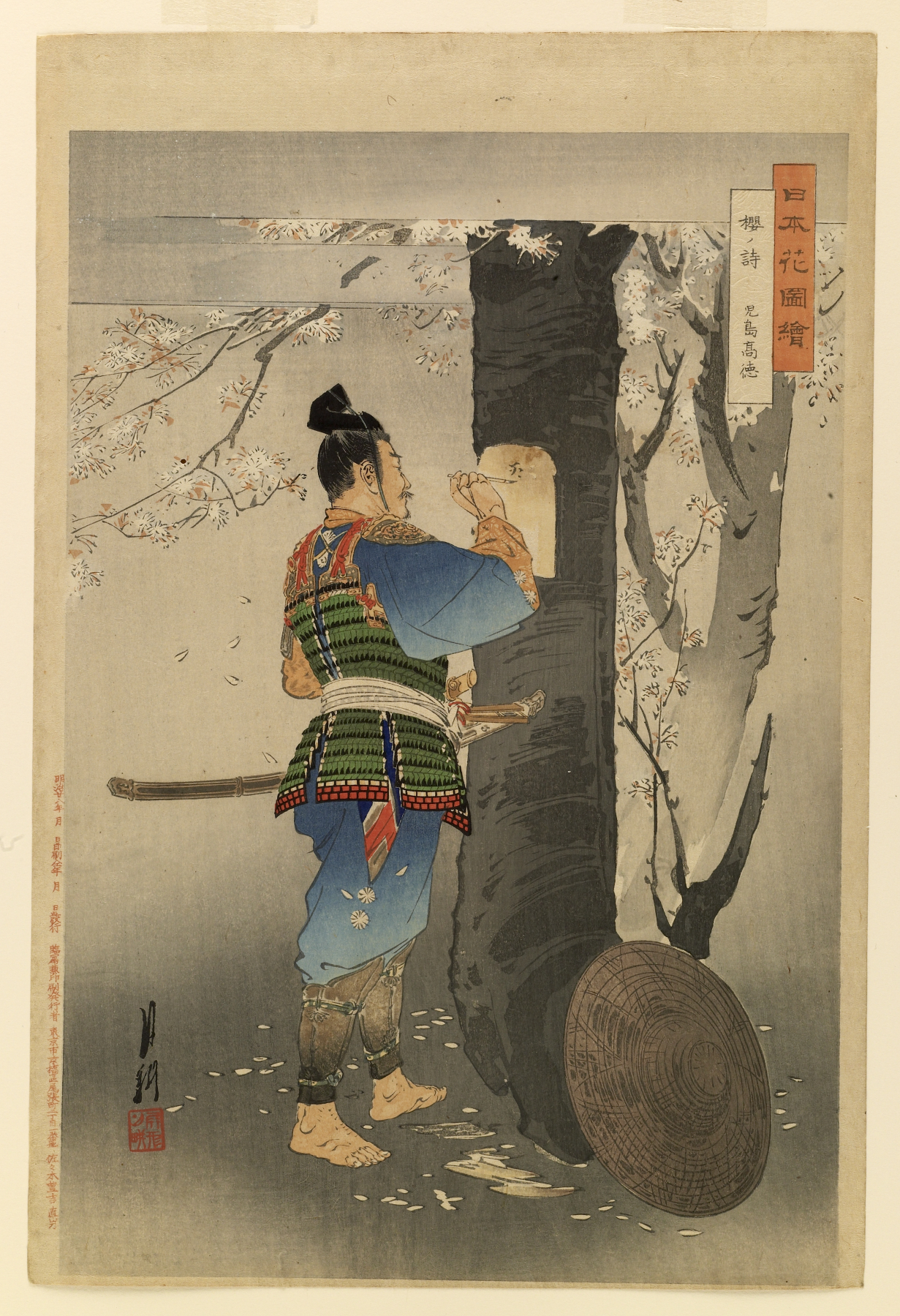
Ukiyoe by Sasaki Toyokichi depicting Kojima Takanori

Sakura Shrine (作楽神社, Sakura Jinja) is a Shinto shrine in the Jingo neighborhood of the city of Tsuyama in Okayama Prefecture, Japan. The main festival of the shrine is held annually on the second Sunday of April.The entire 30,189 square meters precincts of the shrine was designated a National Historic Site in 1922 as the 'Innoshō-no-yakata (Kojima Takanori Legendary place)'.

== Enshrined kami ==
The kami enshrined at Sakura Jinja are:

- Emperor Go-Daigo
- Kojima Takanori

== History ==
Sakura Jinja was founded in 1869 by Matsudaira Yoshinori, the final daimyō of Tsuyama Domain, on the site of the Innoshō-no-yakata, the ruins of the fortified residence of the shugo of Mimasaka Province from the Kamakura period to the Muromachi period. In 1331, Emperor Go-Daigo, having initially failed to overthrow the Kamakura shogunate in the Genkō War, was forced to abdicate the throne and was exiled to the Oki Islands. En route from Kyoto to his place of exile, he stayed overnight at the Innoshō-no-yakata. At this time, anti-Kamakura sentiment in western Japan was strong, and a local magnate in Bizen Province, Kojima Takanori, raised forces in an attempt to rescue Emperor Go-Daigo while he was being escorted into exile. Unable to find a suitable opportunity, he snuck into the Innoshō-no-yakata at night and carved a message into the trunk of a sakura cherry tree with a poem proclaiming his loyalty to the Emperor and a pledge that he would one day rescue him. This story was recorded in the medieval chronicle Taiheiki.

The story gained popularity in the Bakumatsu period and with parallels being drawn between the Genkō War and the Meiji restoration, many feudal lords were searching for ways to ingratiate themselves with the new regime. Matsudaira Yoshinori petitioned for permission to erect a Shinto shrine on the site of the Innoshō-no-yakata, and the shrine was completed in 1869. In 1877, it was granted the rank of Prefectural Shrine, under the State Shinto System of ranked Shinto shrines. In 1907, the actor Kawakami Otojirō, who was performing a historical drama with Kojima Takanori as the main character, donated a new Haiden to the shrine. The current shrine building was rebuilt in 1923.

== Site of the Innoshō-no-yakata ==
Archaeological excavations were conducted in 1973 to 1974 and from 1980 to 1981. The fortified residence occupied an area 200 meters from east to west and 150 meters from north to south. The location of a well and several structures were identified. Artifacts included Celadon porcelain, white porcelain, and Bizen ware.

The shrine is located about 15 minutes on foot from Innoshō Station on the JR West Kishin Line.

== See also ==
- List of Historic Sites of Japan (Okayama)
- List of Shinto shrines
