= Matsudaira Sadayasu =

Japanese daimyō

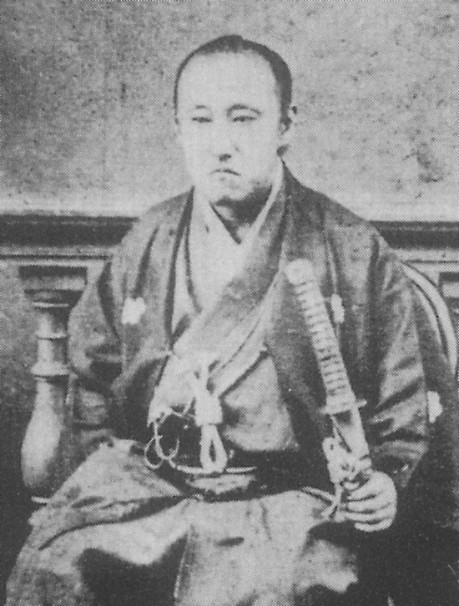
- Matsudaira Sadayasu

10th Daimyō of Matsue
- In office 1853–1871
- Preceded by: Matsudaira Naritoki
- Succeeded by: none

Personal details
- Born: May 5, 1835
- Died: December 1, 1882 (aged 47)

Matsudaira Sadayasu (松平 定安; May 5, 1835 – December 1, 1882) was a Japanese daimyō of the late Edo period, who ruled the Matsue Domain.

== Early life ==
Matsudaira Sadayasu was born in 1835, the seventh son of Matsudaira Naritaka of the Tsuyama Domain. In 1853, he was adopted by Matsudaira Naritoki, the 9th lord of Matsue. Soon after, Naritoki retired, and Sadayasu became lord of Matsue.

== Political career ==
During Sadayasu's tenure as lord, Matsue samurai were deployed to security duties in Osaka and Kyoto. For much of the Bakumatsu period, the policy of Matsue was pro-shogunate.

== Boshin War ==
In 1868, Matsue forces took part in the Boshin War on the side of the Meiji government. The same year, there was a peasant revolt in the Oki Islands, which was part of Matsue territory. Sadayasu dispatched troops to quell it by force; he withdrew after receiving complaints from Satsuma and Chōshū.

== Retirement and death ==
Sadayasu was relieved of his duties as daimyō in 1871, due to the order for the abolition of the domains. He retired from family headship in 1872, in favor of his adopted son Naotaka. However, as Naotaka retired in 1877, Sadayasu again assumed headship until 1882. In 1882 he passed headship to his 3rd son Naosuke. A few weeks later he died, at age 47.

== Notes ==
Preceded by Matsudaira Naritoki	10th Daimyō of Matsue; 1853–1871	Succeeded by none

== See also ==
- Matsue Domain
- Matsudaira Harusato
