= Matsudaira Naritami =

Japanese daimyō

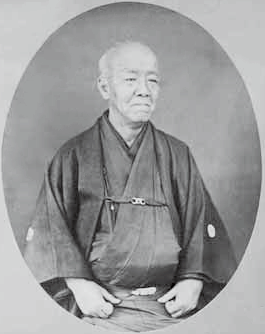

Daimyō of Tsuyama
- In office 1831–1855
- Preceded by: Matsudaira Naritaka
- Succeeded by: Matsudaira Yoshitomo

Personal details
- Born: September 12, 1814
- Died: March 23, 1891 (aged 76), aged 76

Matsudaira Naritami (松平 斉民; September 12, 1814 – March 23, 1891) was a Japanese daimyō of the late Edo period who ruled the Tsuyama Domain of Mimasaka Province.

Born Tokugawa Ginnosuke (銀之助), the 16th son of the shōgun Tokugawa Ienari, Naritami was adopted by Matsudaira Naritaka of Tsuyama. Naritami succeeded him in late 1831, continuing as daimyo of Tsuyama until 1855. Naritami was the lesser-known third candidate in the shogunal succession dispute of 1858 (the other two being Tokugawa Iemochi and Yoshinobu). In a rather curious turn of events, following his retirement, Naritami received a stupendously large pension of 10,000 hyō (俵; bales of rice) directly from the Bakufu; this is believed to have been because of his status as Ienari's son.

Following the Meiji Restoration, Naritami became the guardian of the young Tokugawa Iesato, overseeing his education. As he oversaw most of the principal affairs of the family (particularly during Iesato's time studying abroad), he was secretly known by some as dai jūrokudai (第十六代 "16th generation [lord of the clan]"). Naritami was deeply trusted by Yoshinobu, even with affairs as important as finding good matches for his children. A letter left by Yoshinobu attests to this fact: Before any marriage proposal, be sure to consult with Naritami. During the Meiji era, Naritami was made a shishaku (viscount) in the new nobility system. Naritami, also known as Matsudaira Kakudō, was an acquaintance of Clara Whitney, and is often mentioned in Whitney's early Meiji-era diary.

Naritami's court rank was the rather high senior third rank (shōsanmi 正三位); at different times over the course of his life, he also held the honorary titles of Echigo no Kami 越後守 and Mikawa no Kami 三河守.

Naritami died on March 23, 1891, at age 78.

== Family ==
- Father: Tokugawa Ienari
- Mother: Oyae no Kata (d. 1843) later Kaishun'in
- Wives:
  - Daughter of Matsudaira Naritaka
  - Daughter of Matsudaira Tsunataka
- Children:
  - Matsudaira Yasutomo, Adopted By Matsudaira Yoshitomo
  - Matsudaira Yasutami (1861–1921)
  - Hitoshimaru

Preceded by Matsudaira Naritaka	Daimyō of Tsuyama; 1831–1855	Succeeded by Matsudaira Yoshitomo
