= Mimasaka =

Mimasaka can refer to:

- Mimasaka, Okayama, city in Japan
- Mimasaka Province, former province of Japan
