= Naritaka =

- Gender: Male

Origin
- Origin: Japanese
- Meaning: Different meanings depending on the kanji used

Naritaka (written: 斉荘 or 斉孝) is a masculine Japanese given name. Notable people with the name include:

- Matsudaira Naritaka (松平 斉孝) (1788–1838), Japanese daimyō
- Tokugawa Naritaka (徳川 斉荘) (1810–1845), Japanese daimyō
