= Tsuyama Castle =

Castle in Japan

- 津山城
- Tsuyama, Okayama Prefecture, Japan
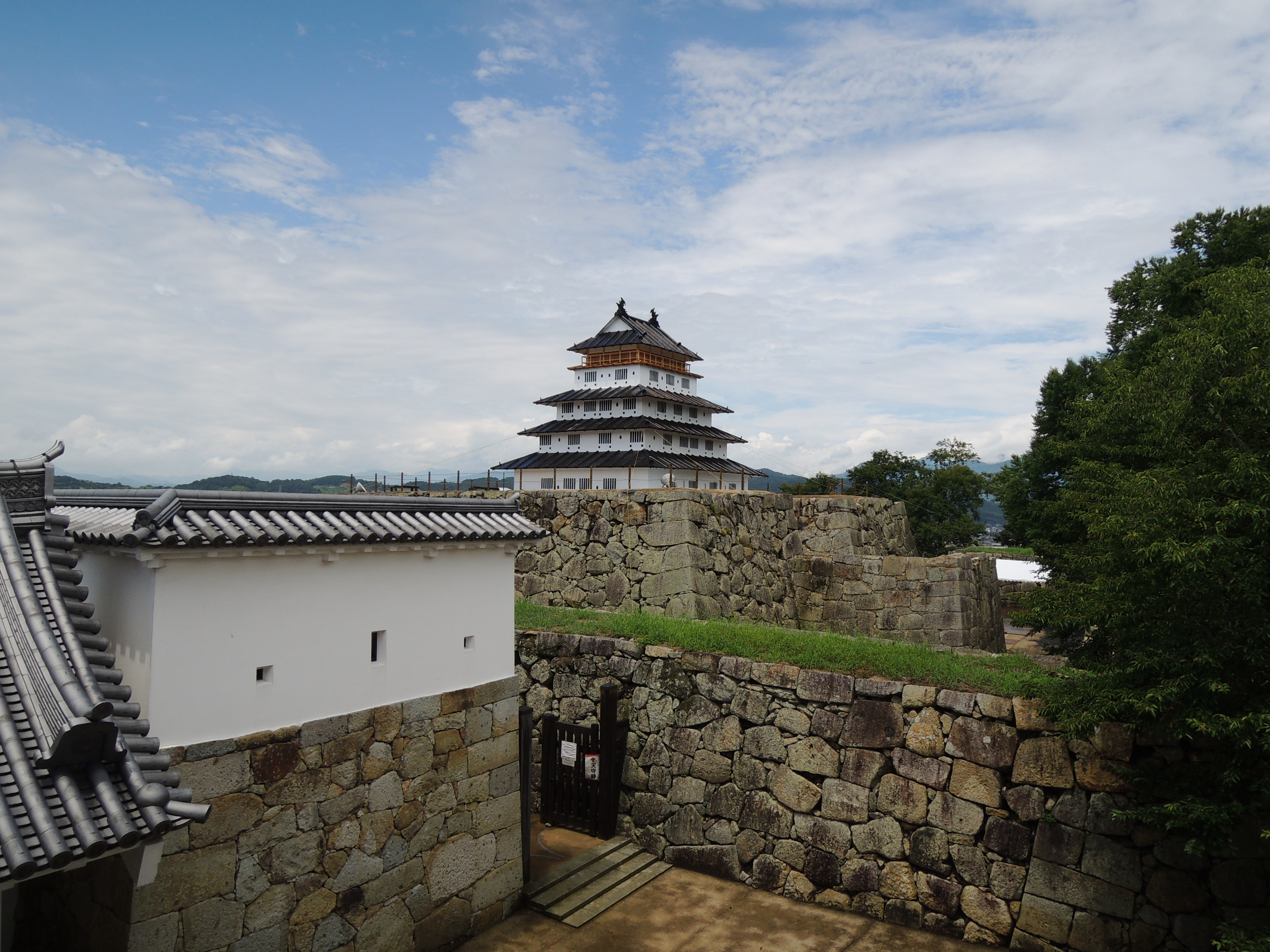

Site information
- Type: Teikaku-style hirayama castle
- Controlled by: Yamana clan (1441–), Mori clan (1603–1697), Matsudaira clan (1698–1871), Japan (1873–present)
- Condition: Mostly ruins, Bitchū-yagura reconstructed in 2005.

Location
- Tsuyama Castle Tsuyama Castle (Japan)
- Coordinates: 35°3′45.97″N 134°0′17.83″E
- Height: (five stories)

Site history
- Built: 1441–1444; major expansions 1603–1616
- Built by: Yamana clan (original); Mori Tadamasa (1603)
- In use: 1616–1873
- Materials: stone, wood, plaster walls
- Demolished: 1874–1875

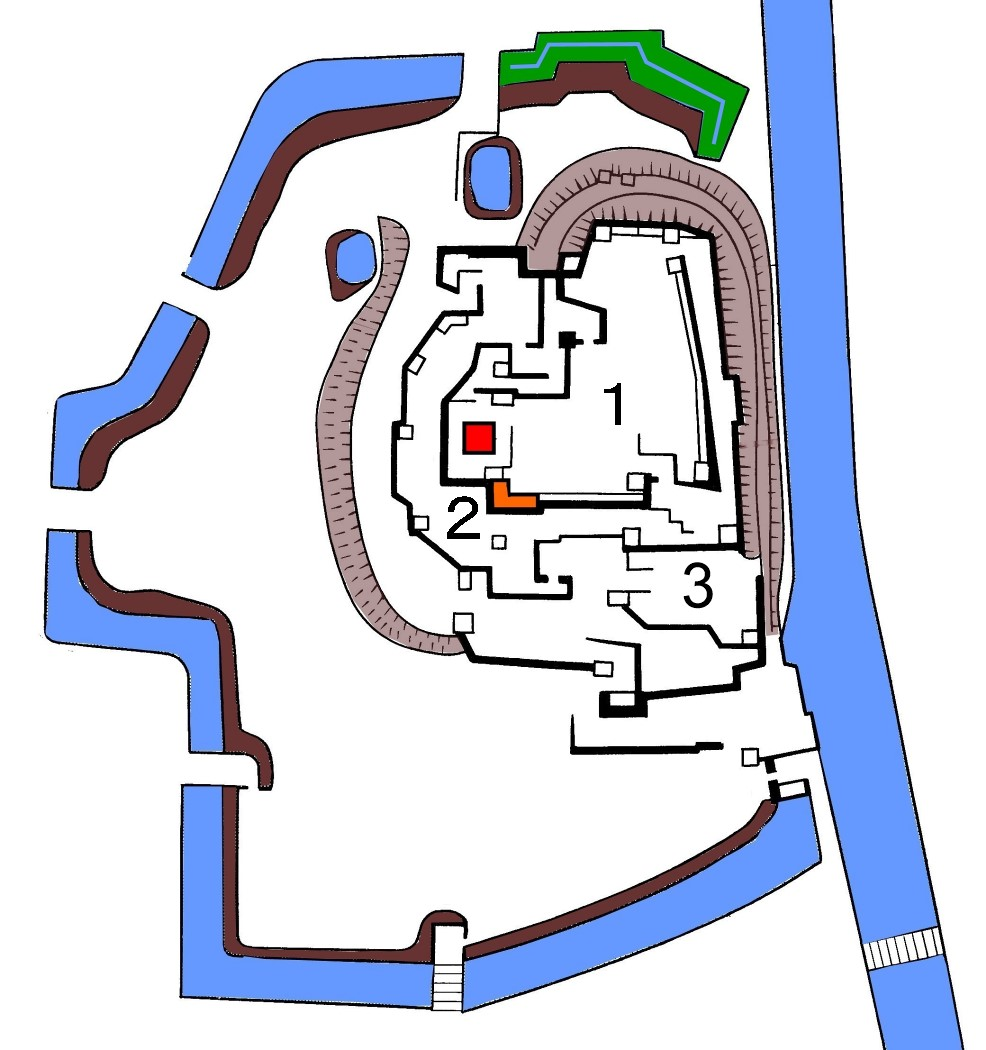
Layout plan of inner and outer castle

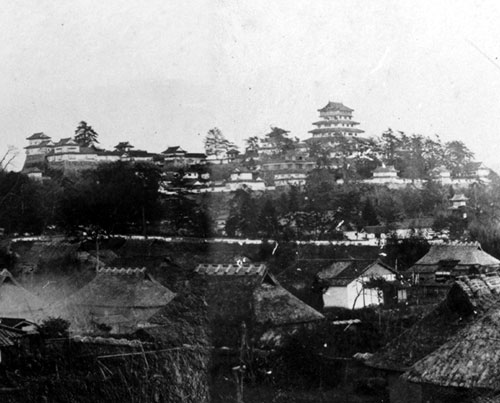
Historic photograph during late Edo period

Tsuyama Castle (Japanese: 津山城, Hepburn: Tsuyama-jō) is a Japanese castle located in the Sange neighborhood of the city of Tsuyama, Okayama Prefecture, in the San'in region of Japan. Tsuyama considered one of Japan's three major hirayama (平山城 hilltop) style castles along with Himeji Castle and Matsuyama Castle, which were all constructed around the same time. During the Edo period, Tsuyama castle served as the primary residence of the daimyō of the Tsuyama Domain under the Tokugawa shogunate. The castle was also called Kakuzan Castle (鶴山城, Kakuzan-jō). It has been protected by the central government as a National Historic Site since 1963.

== History ==
Tsuyama Castle is located in the center of Tsuyama Basin in former Mimasaka Province. It was an important junction of roads connecting Himeji and Okayama on the Seto Inland Sea with Tottori and Yonago on the Sea of Japan, and was also a post station on the Izumi kaidō, the main pilgrimage route to Izumo Shrine. Later the Tsuyama area prospered also from its location on the Yoshiigawa river. During the Kamakura period and early Muromachi period, the center of Mimasaka was at Innoshō, approximately ten kilometers to the west, where the Yamana clan, the shugo of the province had their fortified residence and Kamae Castle. Around 1441-1444, Yamana Norikiyo ordered the construction of a castle at Tsuru Mountain (i.e. Kakuzan Castle), which was later abandoned as the Yamana clan was greatly weakened in the Ōnin War.

During the Sengoku period, the Mori clan were retainers of Oda Nobunaga. Mori Ranmaru served as Nobunaga's page and died with him at the Honnō-ji Incident in 1582. His younger brother Mori Tadamasa served Tokugawa Ieyasu and was awarded with Matsushiro Castle in Shinano Province after the Battle of Sekigahara in 1600. In 1604, after the death of Kobayakawa Hideaki, Mori Tadamada was transferred to Mimasaka Province and awarded a new domain with a kokudaka of 186,000 koku centered on Tsuyama. Finding Kamae Castle unsuitable as it was located in a geographically narrow location, he began construction of a new castle on the ruins of Kakuzan Castle. This castle was completed in 1616, at which time it had a five-story tenshu and 77 yagura turrets. Mori Tadamasa named the new castle "Tsuyama Castle".

However, the Mori clan became extinct in 1697 and the domain was absorbed into the holdings of Asano Tsunanaga of Hiroshima Domain. The following year, the domain was revived as a 100,000 koku holding for a cadet branch of the Echizen-Matsudaira clan which descended from Yūki Hideyasu, Tokugawa Ieyasu's second son. The Matsudaira clan would rule Tsuyama to the Meiji restoration in 1871. The castle was kept in good repair through the Edo era, although the Honmaru Place was lost to a fire in 1809.

== Current situation ==
After the Meiji restoration, all buildings except one gate (which was moved to neighboring Nakayama Shrine) were demolished in 1873 and the site of the castle became Kakuzan Park (鶴山公園, 'Kakuzan Kōen). Several gates were reconstructed from 1874 to 1875, and the collapse of the stone walls of the Koshimaki yagura in 1890 led to conservation measures on the remaining stone walls. In 1900 the castle site became property of Tsuyama municipality and over 5000 sakura trees were planted and in 1905 the Han school Shudokan (修道館) was relocated to Sannomaru and renamed Kakuzankan (鶴山館). A regional Industrial Promotion Exposition was held in 1936 during which time a faux tenshu was reconstructed, but it was demolished in 1945 to prevent its use as a landmark by enemy air raids. To celebrate the castle's 400-year anniversary in 2004, the Bitchū yagura was reconstructed, and the Taiko fence was repaired in 2006. Tsuyama Castle was listed as one of Japan's Top 100 Castles by the Japan Castle Foundation in 2006.

Every year from 1 to 15 April, the Tsuyama Cherry Blossom Festival is held around the castle ruins park. The castle is about 15 minutes on foot from Tsuyama Station on the JR West Kishin Line or Tsuyama Line.

== Structure ==
At the nearby Tsuyama Folk Museum, there is a restored model of Tsuyama Castle based on documents and old photographs. Located in the central part of the Tsuyama Basin, the Miya River, a tributary of the Yoshii River that flows to the east of the castle, and the natural cliffs of the hills are incorporated into the defensive line. The Yoshii River, which flows through the southern part of the castle, and its tributary, the Ida River, which is located in the western part, are the outer walls, protect age main part of the castle town. The total of 77 yagura turrets, including the outer walls, surpassed Hiroshima Castle's 76 yagura and Himeji Castle's 61 yagura.

== Legends ==
=== Glaring pine ===
Mori Tadamasa had two servants, Ido Uemon (井戸宇右衛門) and Nagoya Kyuemon (名護屋九右衛門). Ido had served Tadamasa's father before him and excelled in martial arts. Nagoya was a relatively new servant from Shinano who was the younger brother of Tadamasa's wife. Nagoya and Ido were competing for the castle to be built on their land, and their relations were strained. Tadamasa did not approve of competition and sought to recruit an assassin to kill Ido. Nagoya volunteered, but Tadamasa denied him. He continued to volunteer, until eventually Tadamasa accepted him, and gave him a katana. Ido arrived later at Innoshō with his colleagues and upon arrival was attacked by Nagoya who shouted, "The order of one's lord!". Ido was, however, a battle veteran, and killed Nagoya, suffering only a small wound. When his colleagues heard that Nagoya was attacking on "the order of one's lord", they killed Ido themselves and later killed his two younger brothers. After that incident, castle construction in Innoshō was cancelled and changed to Mount Tsuru.

The tomb of Ido and his brothers was built on the south side of the Izumo kaidō highway and the tomb of Nagoya was built on the north side. On top of their graves, a pine tree was planted. On the road between the graves, bizarre phenomenon began to occur. Therefore, the road was moved in 1655, passing north of both graves. After this, the north and south sides of the pine alternated between lush growth and wilting. People thought that Ido and Nagoya were still fighting after their deaths. The pine was given the name "pine glaring at each other" (睨み合いの松/Niramiai no Matsu).

=== Blueprint ===
Kokura Castle was a famous castle by the sea in western Japan. Mori Tadamasa sent a spies to Kokura to try to observe the fortification from the sea. One night, light leaked out from the spies' ship, revealing their location to the castle. Taken into the castle, Hosokawa Tadaoki, heard their story and forgave them and gave them a copy of the castle blueprint and released them. Tadamasa constructed Tsuyama Castle by referencing these blueprints.

After Tsuyama Castle was completed, Hosokawa Tadaoki sent a bell imported from Southeast Asia to Mori Tadamasa. The bell hung in the castle tower until the Meiji Restoration.

=== Fifth floor ===
When the Edo Period started, tenshu with five floors or more were banned. Officials were dispatched by the Tokugawa shogunate to inspect castles, and towers which violated the edict would be demolished. At the time, Tsuyama Castle had five floors. In an attempt to circumvent the ban, Mori Tadamasa removed the roof of the fourth floor. When the officials came and claimed that his tenshu had five floors, Tadamasa insisted that since the fourth floor had no roofing, it did not count. The officials were eventually convinced and permission was granted to keep the tower. Therefore, the fourth floor has no tiled roof.

== Gallery ==
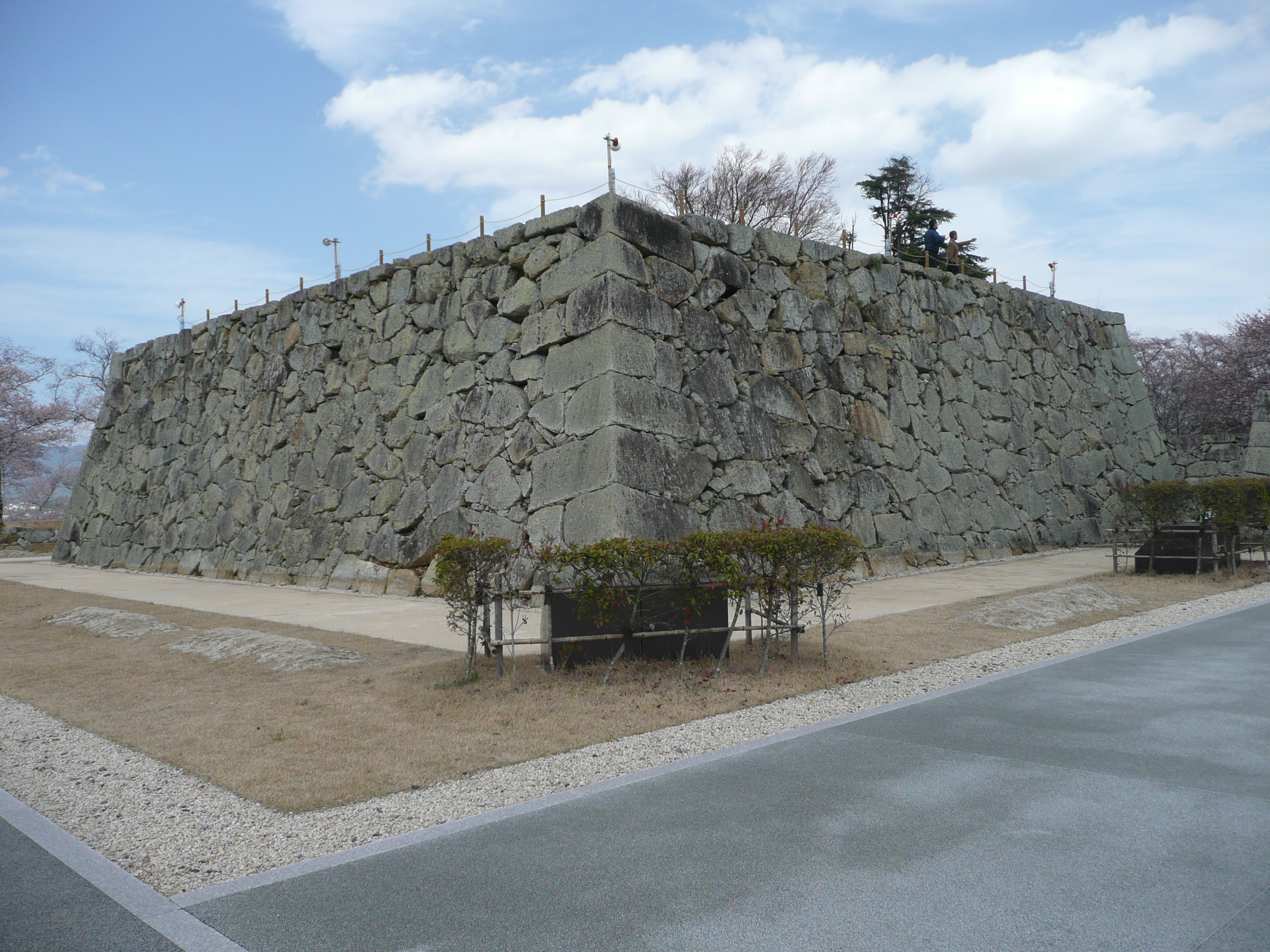
Stone base of the tenshu

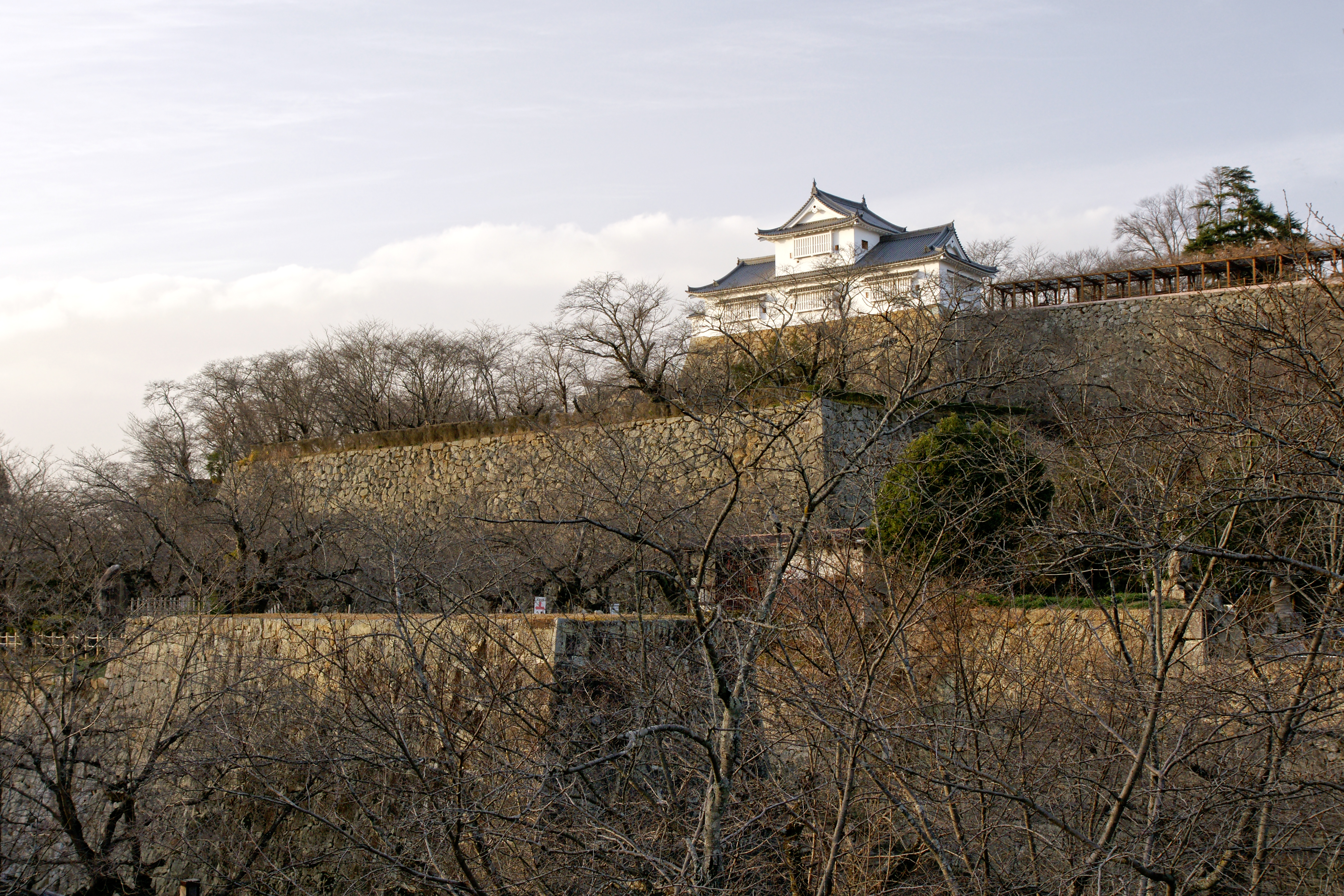
Stone wall and Bitchū-yagura

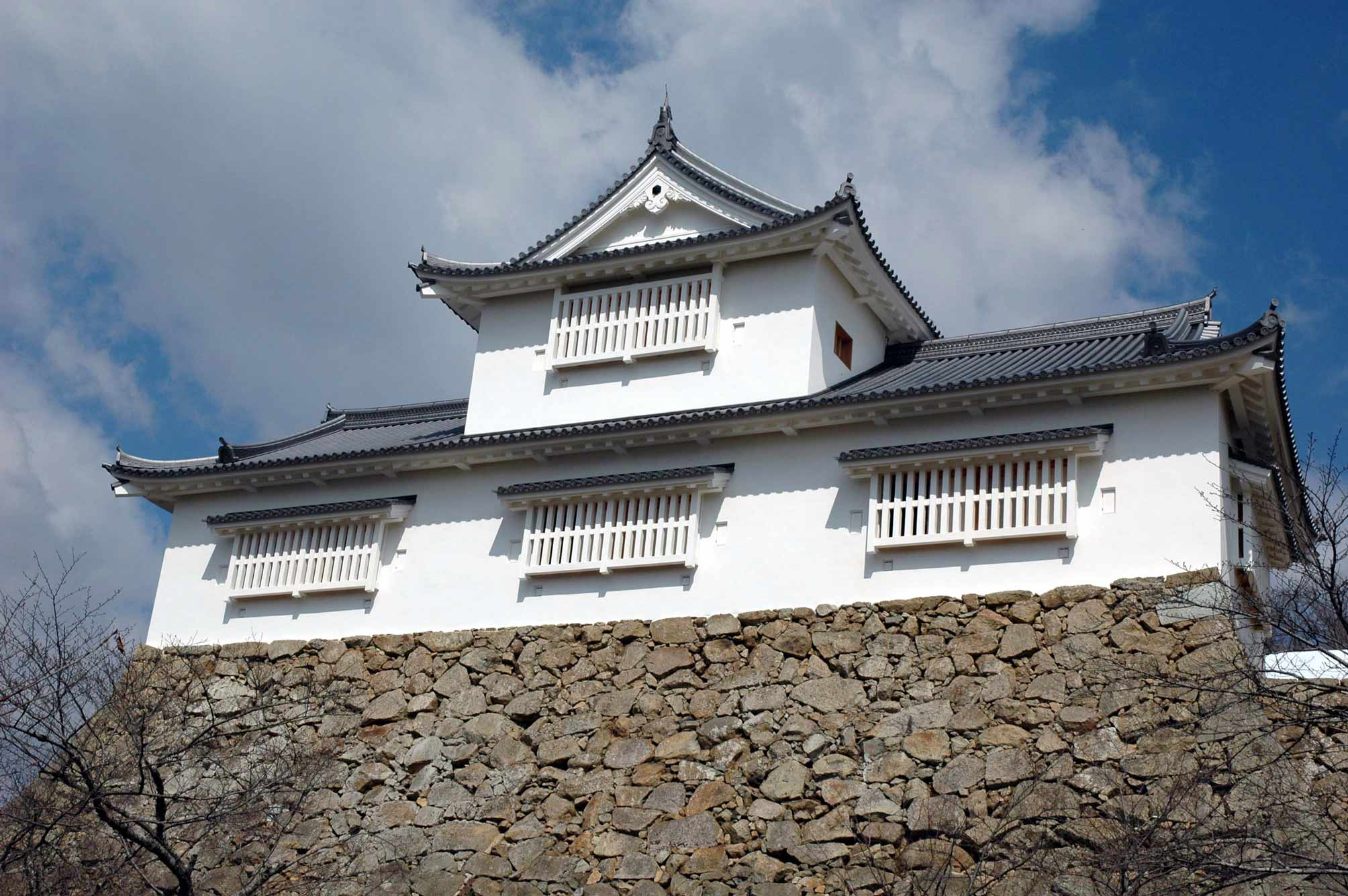
Bitchū-yagura

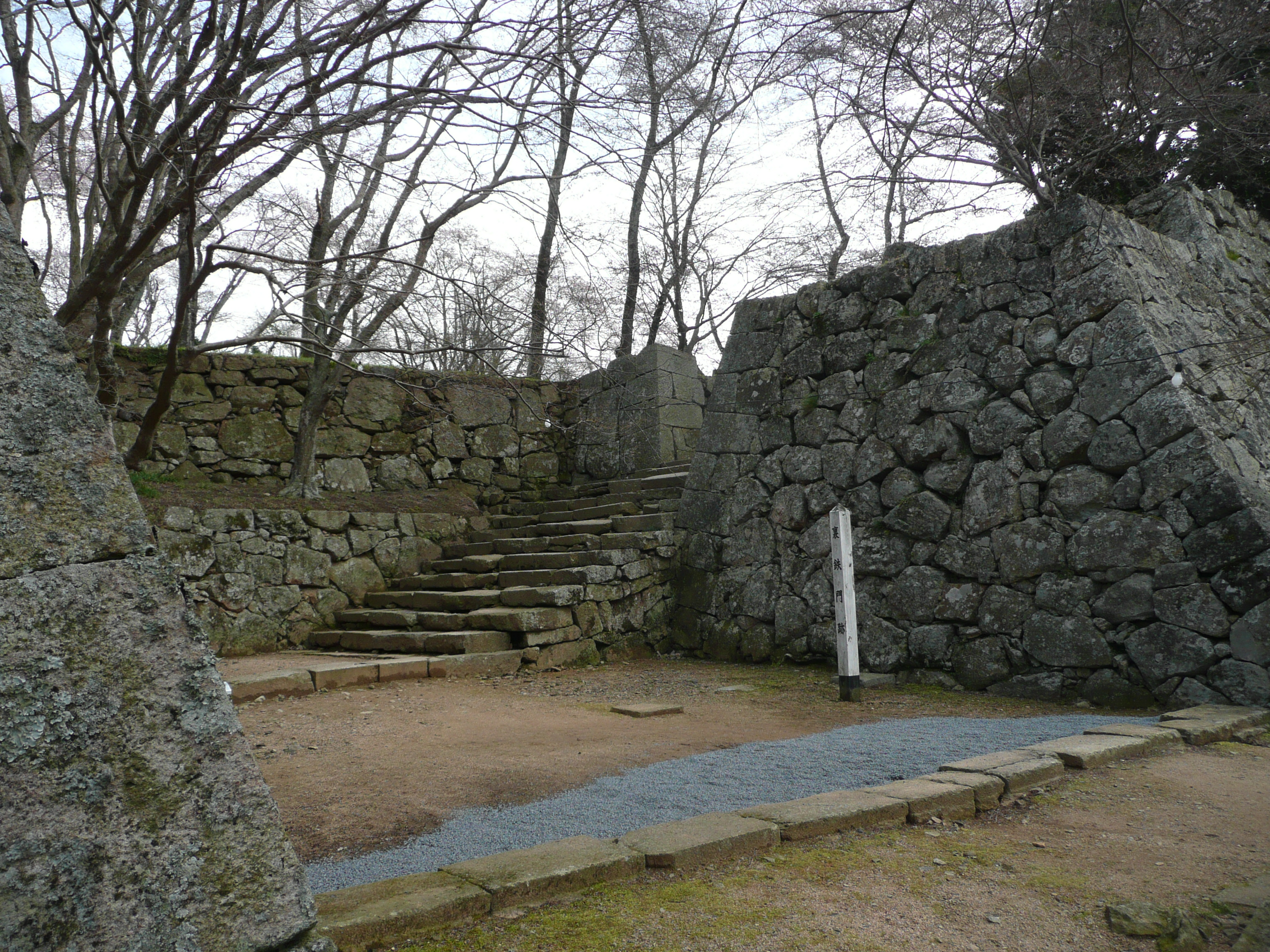
Ruins of Uratetu-mon

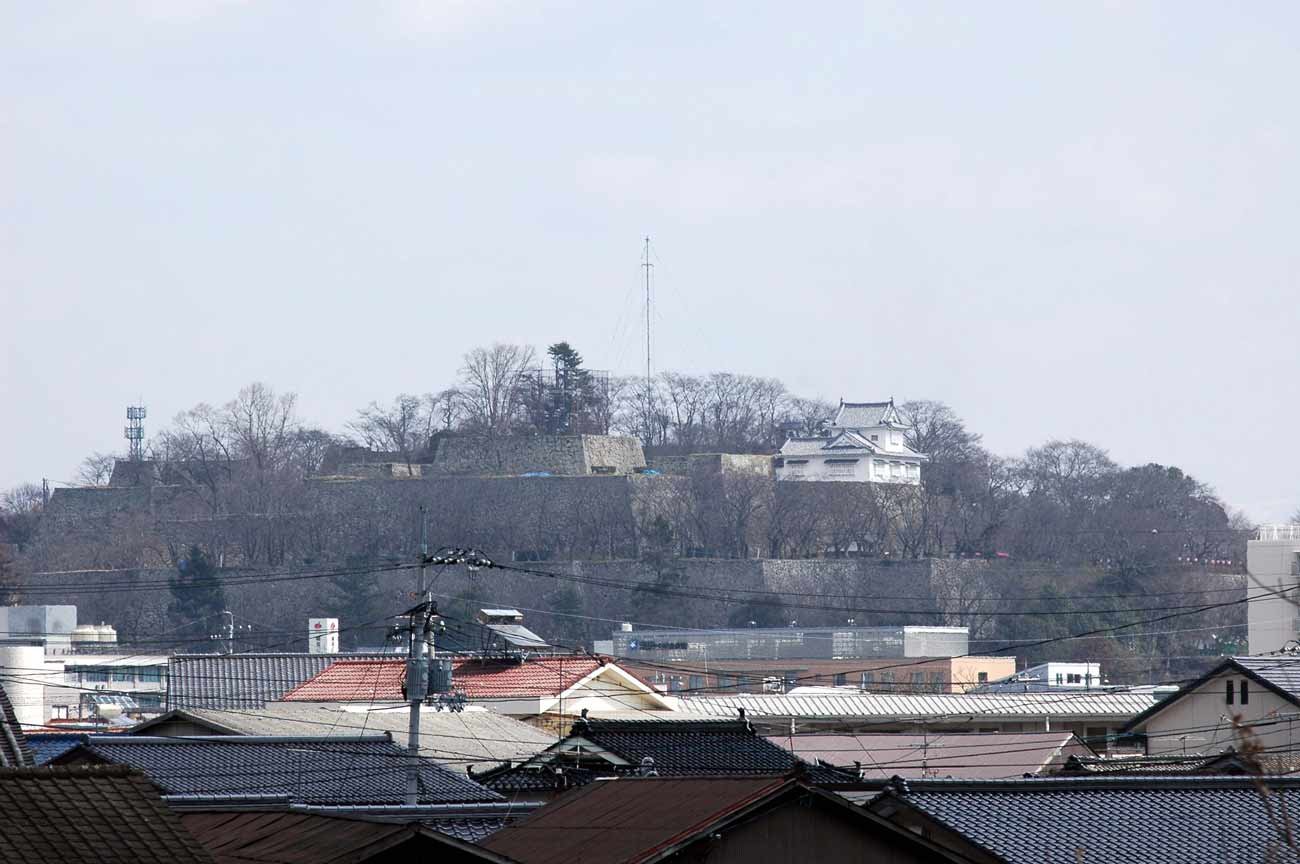
Tsuyama Castle ruins

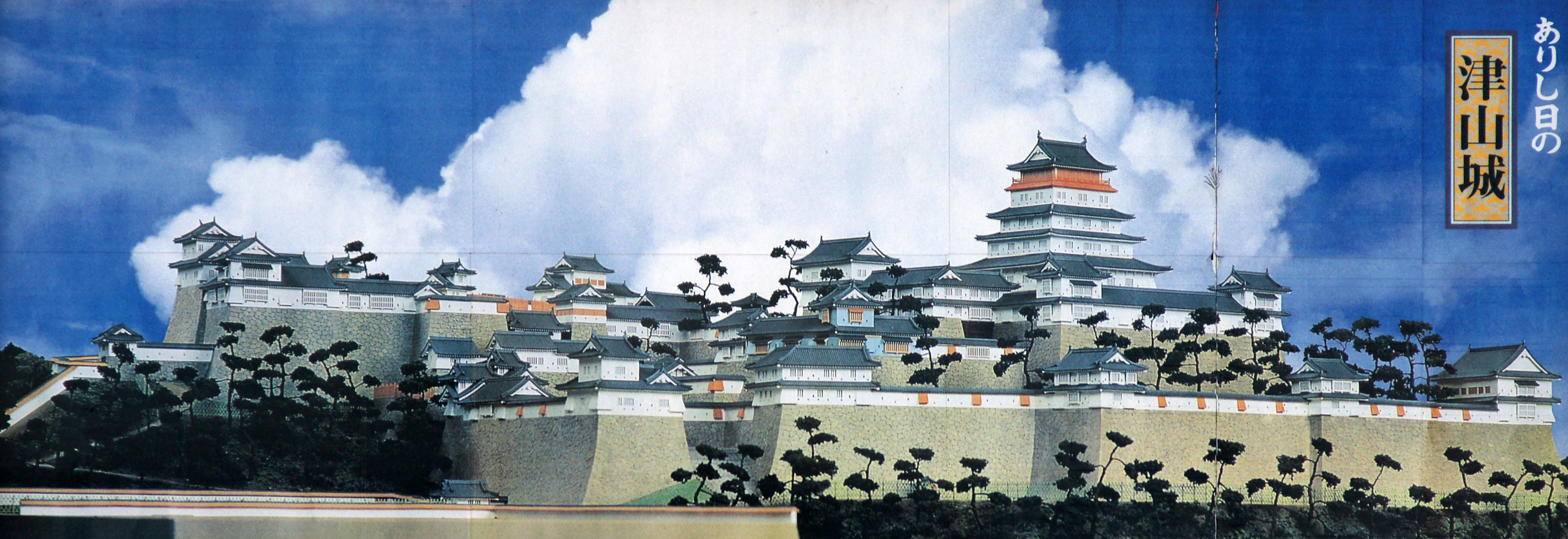
Reconstructed visualisation

== See also ==
- Himeji Castle and Matsuyama Castle (Iyo), also built in the hirayama (平山城 flat hilltop castle) style
- List of Historic Sites of Japan (Okayama)
- Matsudaira clan - Yūki-Matsudaira clan (Echizen)
- Mori clan
- Shūraku-en, historic garden in Tsuyama
- Tsuyama Domain
