= Akebono scale =

Common scale used in Japanese music

The Akebono scale is a musical scale commonly used in traditional Japanese music. Akebono and the Diatonic scale use the same intervals, but Akebono has no fixed tonic; as such, any Akebono note can be the tonic.

The 1891 Transactions of the Asiatic Society of Japan describes the scale:

For short transitions the simple pressure on the 4th and its octave 9th would be sufficient; for longer cheerful compositions however Akebono was invented. This tuning, and other variations already noticed are not recognized by the Japanese as choshi: they are called te; and it is not necessary in these subordinate tunings, invented purely for convenience, to look for diatonic scale notes.
