= Kimura Akebono =

Japanese writer (1872–1890)

- 木村曙
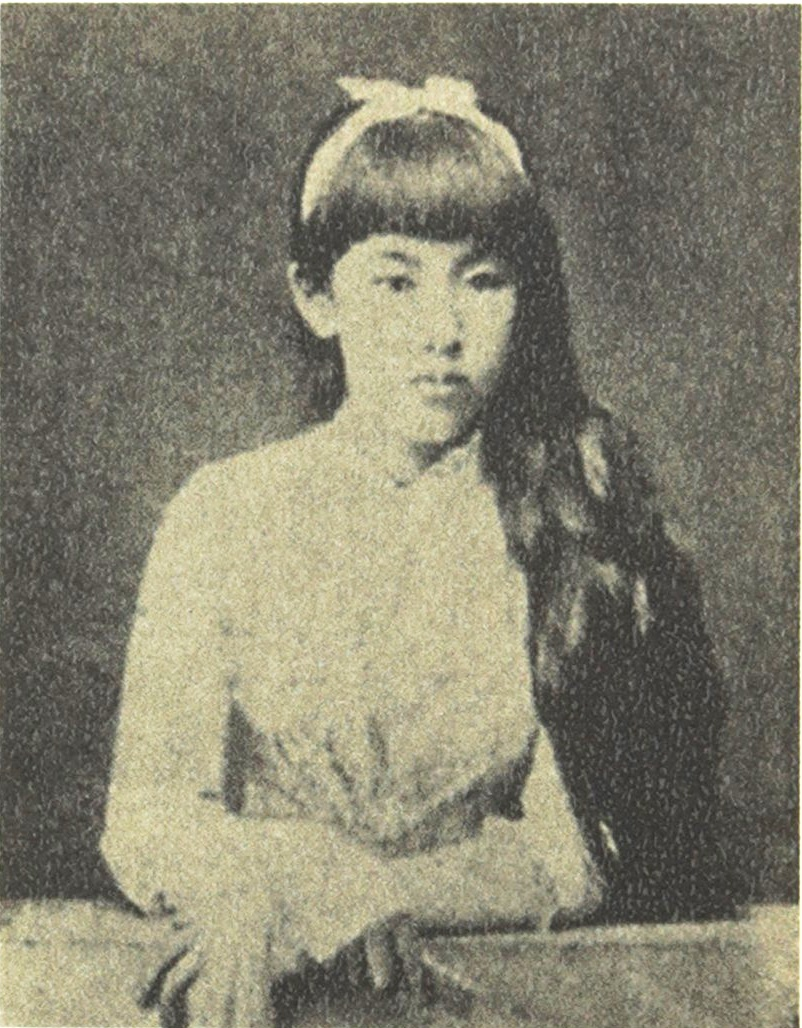
- Born: Okamoto Eiko; April 10, 1872; Kobe, Japan
- Died: October 19, 1890 (aged 18)

Kimura Akebono (木村曙; April 10, 1872–October 19, 1890) was a Japanese writer. She is best known for her debut work Fujo no Kagami (婦女の鑑).

== Biography ==
Kimura was born Okamoto Eiko on April 10, 1872, in Kobe, Japan. Her father, Kimura Shōhei, was a wealthy businessman. He had around 30 children with many women and Kimura was his oldest daughter. She attended Tokyo Women's Higher School and graduated in 1888. While attending school she studied French, and had hoped to study abroad. However, her father refused to allow her to. She married, then divorced the son of a wealthy merchant on her father's orders, after her husband's misbehavior embarrassed the family.

After graduation Kimura worked at a butcher shop called "Iroha" that her father owned in Asakusa. She wrote her first novel, Fujo no Kagami (婦女の鑑) while working at the cash register in the store. The novel was published serially in the Yomiuri Shinbun in 1889 on the recommendation of Aeba Koson. Kimura was seventeen years old at the time.

Fujo no Kagami (婦女の鑑) is about a young woman named Hideko who studies abroad in the United Kingdom and trains in the textile industry in the United States. Upon returning to Japan, Hideko starts a textile factory of her own where she trains women and helps them achieve financial independence.

Kimura wrote several other works such as Misao Kurabe (操くらべ) and Wakamatsu (わか松) before she died of tuberculous peritonitis on October 19, 1890.

== Selected works ==
- Fujo no Kagami (婦女の鑑), 1889
- Misao Kurabe (操くらべ), 1889
- Wakamatsu (わか松), 1890
