= Akebono Maru No.28 =

Japanese fishing trawler

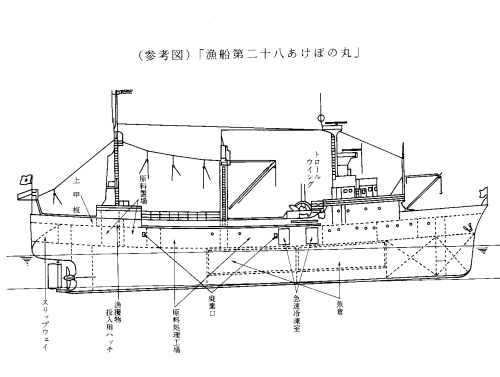

History
- Name: Akebono Maru No.28
- Launched: 28 May 1974
- Completed: 1974
- Identification: IMO number: 7394826
- Fate: Sunk near Alaska

General characteristics
- Type: Fishing trawler
- Tonnage: 516 DWT
- Length: 56.14 m (184 ft 2 in)
- Beam: 10.83 m (35 ft 6 in)

Akebono Maru No. 28 was a Japanese fishing trawler that capsized on 5 January 1982. The Minerals Management Service of Alaska reported she sank 50 miles (80 km) north of the Adak and notes it at the top of its list of "Alaska's Ten Worst Shipping Losses In The Last 20 Years". In total, 32 people died.
