= Matsudaira Naritaka =

Japanese daimyō

- 松平 斉孝
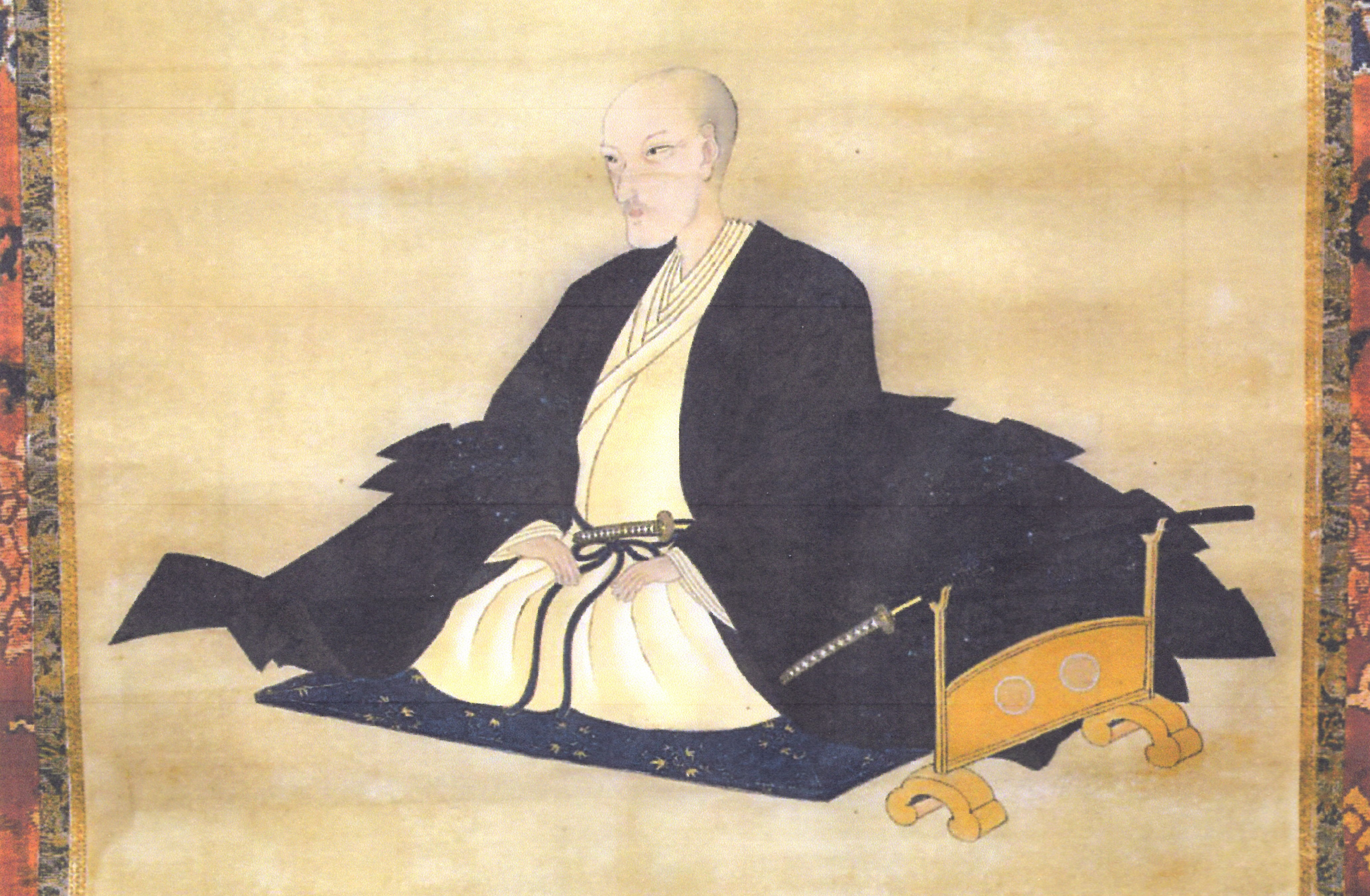

Daimyō of Tsuyama
- In office 1805–1831
- Preceded by: Matsudaira Yasuharu
- Succeeded by: Matsudaira Naritami

Personal details
- Born: February 9, 1788
- Died: February 26, 1838 (aged 50)
- Spouse: A daughter of Matsudaira Haruyoshi of Fukui

Matsudaira Naritaka (松平 斉孝) (February 9, 1788 – February 26, 1838) was a Japanese daimyō of the late Edo period who ruled the Tsuyama Domain of Mimasaka Province. Naritaka was the fourth son of Matsudaira Yasuchika, the fifth generation lord of Tsuyama; however, his brother Yasuharu succeeded to family headship first. After Yasuharu's death, Naritaka became lord of Tsuyama; however, he was discontented with the aloof treatment which Tsuyama received from the Tokugawa house, despite its status as a shinpan (親藩; Tokugawa-branch) domain. The domain had also been reduced from its former income of 100,000 koku. Consequently, though he had many children of his own, he adopted the shōgun Ienari's son Ginnosuke, in order to improve the relations between Tsuyama and the main Tokugawa family. Upon Ginnosuke's adoption in 1817, 50,000 koku was added to the Tsuyama income, returning it to its previous 100,000 koku. Naritaka resigned in the winter of 1831, and Ginnosuke, as Matsudaira Naritami, succeeded him. Matsudaira Sadayasu, his son by birth, became lord of the Matsue Domain.

Naritaka died in 1838, while in retirement.

Preceded by Matsudaira Yasuharu	Daimyō of Tsuyama; 1805–1831	Succeeded by Matsudaira Naritami
