= Katsuyama Domain =

Japanese feudal domain located in Mimasaka Province

Katsuyama Domain 勝山藩
- under Tokugawa shogunate Japan
- 1767–1871
- Mon of the Miura clan
- Capital: Katsuyama Castle
- Area
  - Coordinates: 35°5′22.92″N 133°41′35.25″E
  - Type: Daimyō
- Historical era: Edo period
  - Established: 1767
  - Disestablished: 1871
- Today part of: part of Okayama Prefecture

Location of Katsuyama Castle
Katsuyama Domain (Japan)

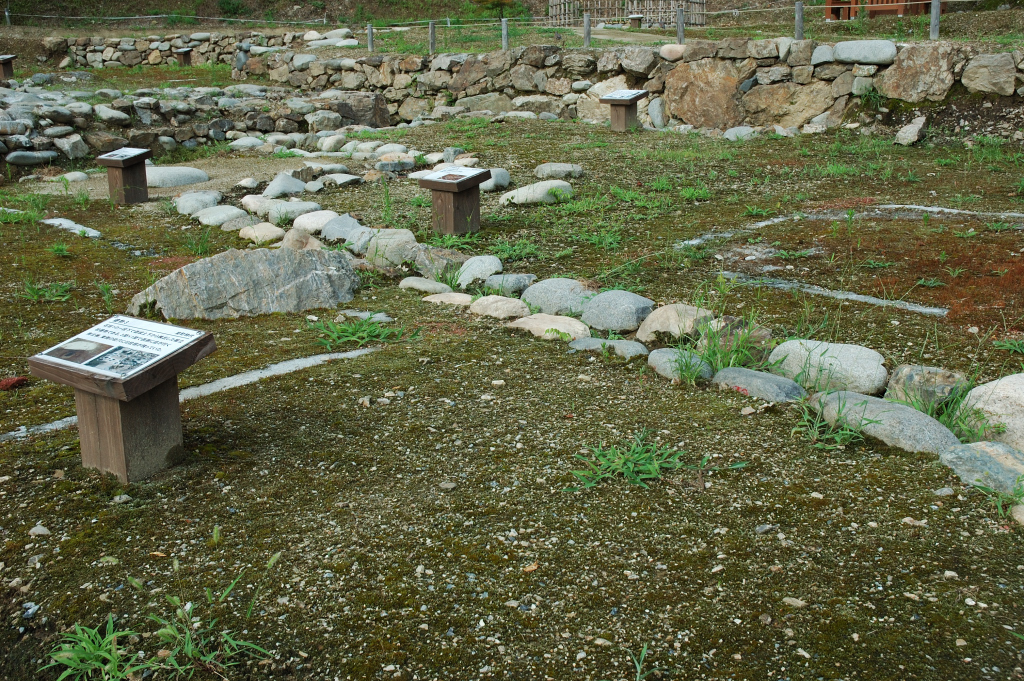
Foundation stones of Katsuyama Castle

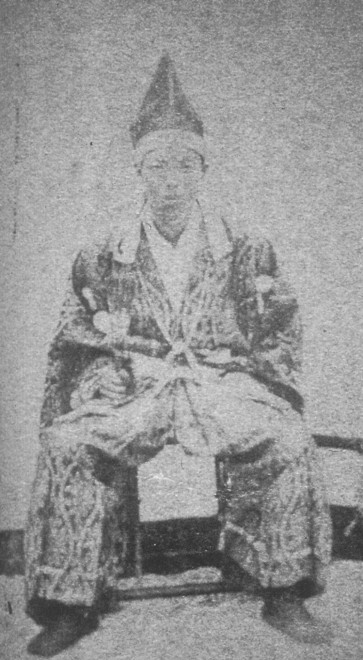
Miura Takatsugu, last daimyō of Katsuyama

Katsuyama Domain (勝山藩, Katuyama-han) was a feudal domain under the Tokugawa shogunate of Edo period Japan, located in Mimasaka Province in what is now the northern portion of modern-day Okayama Prefecture. It was centered around Katsuyama Castle which was located in what is now the city of Maniwa, Okayama and was controlled by a cadet branch tozama daimyō Miura clan throughout all of its history. It was initially known as Takada Domain (高田藩) after the original name of Katsuyama Castle, and in the late Bakumatsu period it was renamed Mashima Domain (真島藩) after its location in Mashima County.

== History ==
In 1764, the fudai daimyō Miura Akitsugu transferred from Nishio Domain in Mikawa Province to a holding of equivalent kokudaka in Mimasaka Province. He rebuilt Takada Castle and renamed it Katsuyama Castle, and laid out a new jōkamachi which became the Katsuyama neighborhood of Maniwa. His son, Miura Noritsugu, encouraged the development of iron mines and iron ore remained a domain monopoly to the end of the Edo Period. The 9th daimyō, Miura Hirotsugu, supported the shogunate in the Bakumatsu period, but his son, and final daimyō, Miura Takatsugu supported the imperial cause and the clan was later ennobled with the kazoku peerage title of shishaku (viscount).

In 1871 domain became "Mashima Prefecture" due to the abolition of the han system. It was incorporated into Okayama Prefecture via Hojo Prefecture.

== Holdings at the end of the Edo period ==
As with most domains in the han system, Katsuyama Domain consisted of several discontinuous territories calculated to provide the assigned kokudaka, based on periodic cadastral surveys and projected agricultural yields.

- Mimasaka Province
  - 107 villages in Mashima District
  - 1 village in Ōba District

== List of daimyō ==
| # | Name | Tenure | Courtesy title | Court Rank | kokudaka |
|---|---|---|---|---|---|
Miura clan, 1764-1871 (fudai daimyō)
| 1 | Miura Akitsugu (三浦 明次) | 1764 - 1772 | Shima-no-kami (志摩守) | Junior 5th Rank, Lower Grade (従五位下) | 23,000 koku |
| 2 | Miura Noritsugu (三浦 矩次) | 1772 - 1780 | Shima-no-kami (志摩守) | Junior 5th Rank, Lower Grade (従五位下) | 23,000 koku |
| 3 | Miura Chikatsugu (三浦前次) | 1780 - 1816 | Shima-no-kami (志摩守) | Junior 5th Rank, Lower Grade (従五位下) | 23,000 koku |
| 4 | Miura Terutsugu (三浦毗次) | 1816 - 1830 | Bingo-no-kami (備後守) | Junior 5th Rank, Lower Grade (従五位下) | 23,000 koku |
| 5 | Miura Nobutsugu (三浦誠次) | 1830 - 1831 | Shima-no-kami (志摩守) | Junior 5th Rank, Lower Grade (従五位下) | 23,000 koku |
| 6 | Miura Toshitsugu (三浦峻次) | 1831 - 1839 | Iki-no-kami (壱岐守) | Junior 5th Rank, Lower Grade (従五位下) | 23,000 koku |
| 7 | Miura Yoshitsugu (三浦義次) | 1839 - 1848 | Bingo-no-kami (備後守) | Junior 5th Rank, Lower Grade (従五位下) | 23,000 koku |
| 8 | Miura Akitsugu (三浦朗次) | 1848 - 1860 | Shima-no-kami (志摩守) | Junior 5th Rank, Lower Grade (従五位下) | 23,000 koku |
| 9 | Miura Hirotsugu (三浦弘次) | 1860 - 1868 | Bingo-no-kami (備後守) | Junior 5th Rank, Lower Grade (従五位下) | 23,000 koku |
| 9 | Miura Takatsugu (三浦顕次) | 1868 - | Bingo-no-kami (備後守); Genba-no-kami (玄蕃守) | Junior 5th Rank, Lower Grade (従五位下) | 23,000 koku |

== See also ==
- List of Han
- Abolition of the han system
