= Japanese destroyer Akebono =

Four Japanese destroyers have been named Akebono (曙 / あけぼの, "dawn" or "daybreak"):

- Japanese destroyer Akebono (1899), an Ikazuchi-class destroyer of the Imperial Japanese Navy during the Russo-Japanese War
- Japanese destroyer Akebono (1930), a Fubuki-class destroyer of the Imperial Japanese Navy during World War II
- JDS Akebono (DE-201), a destroyer escort (or frigate) of the Japanese Maritime Self-Defense Force in 1956
- JS Akebono (DD-108), a Murasame-class destroyer (1994) that entered into service of the Japanese Maritime Self-Defense Force in 2002

== See also ==
- Akebono (disambiguation)
