= Tsuyama Domain =

Administrative division in western Japan during the Edo period (1600-1871)

Tsuyama Domain 津山藩
- Domain of Japan
- 1600–1871
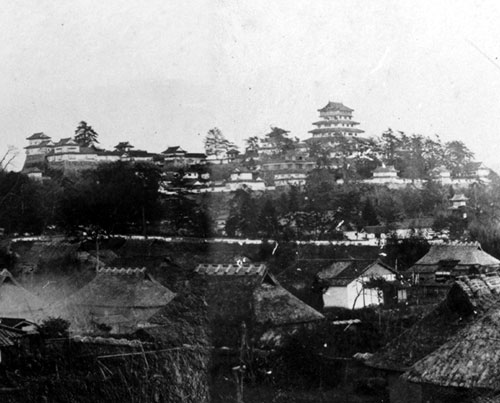
- Tsuyama Castle in Tsuyama, Okayama before 1873

- Mon of the Echizen-Matsudaira clan
- Capital: Tsuyama Castle
- Area
  - Coordinates: 35°3′45.97″N 134°0′17.83″E
- Historical era: Edo period
  - Established: 1600
  - Abolition of the han system: 1871
- Contained within
  - Province: Mimasaka Province
- Today part of: Okayama Prefecture

Location of Tsuyama Castle
Tsuyama Domain (Japan)

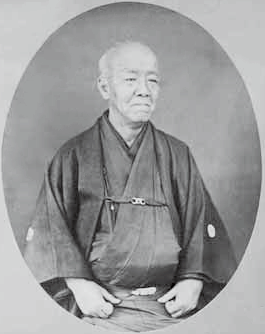
Matsudaira Naritami, 8th daimyo of Tsuyama

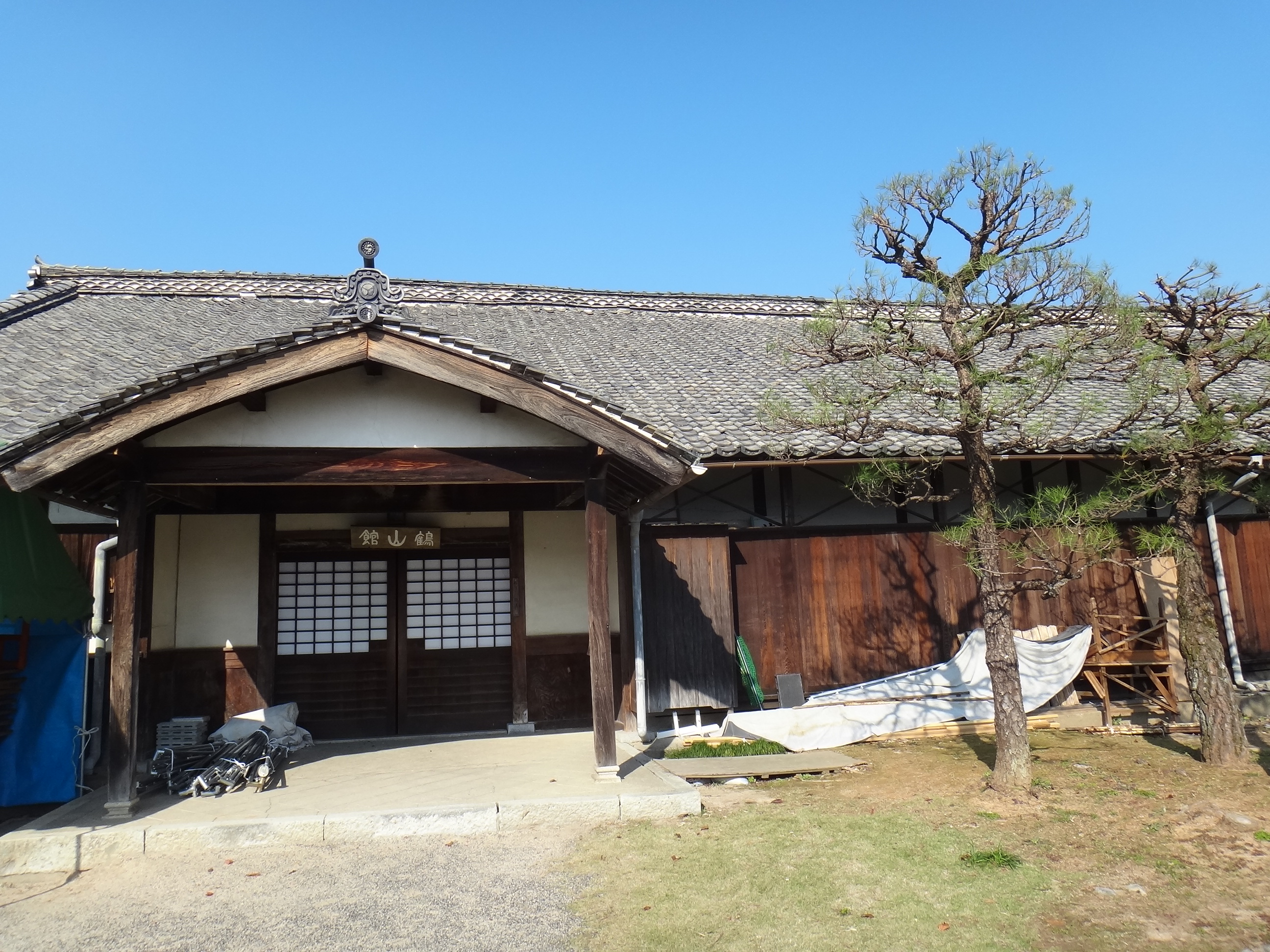
Kakuzankan, han school

Tsuyama Domain (津山藩, Tsuyama-han) was a feudal domain under the Tokugawa shogunate of Edo period Japan, in what is now northern Okayama Prefecture. It controlled most of Mimasaka Province and was centered around Tsuyama Castle. It was ruled in its early history by a branch of the Mori clan, and later by a branch of the Matsudaira clan. Tsuyama Domain was dissolved in the abolition of the han system in 1871 and is now part of Okayama Prefecture.

== History ==
In 1600, after the Battle of Sekigahara, Mimasaka Province was ruled by Kobayakawa Hideaki, the daimyō of Okayama Domain. However, his domain was abolished due to attainder on his death without heir in 1602. In 1603, the Tokugawa shogunate appointed Mori Tadamasa, the son of Mori Yoshinari of Kawanakajima Domain in Shinano Province and the younger brother of Oda Nobunaga's page Mori Ranmaru, to the newly created Tsuyama Domain with a kokudaka of 186,000 koku. He changed the name of the area, which was originally called Tsuruyama (鶴山) to "Tsuyama", began construction of Tsuyama Castle in 1604 and completed the layout of his castle town by 1616. In 1697, his 5th generation successor Mori Sugutoshi went insane in Ise Province on his way to Edo to fulfill his sankin kōtai duties. The "madness" may have been an excuse, as Sugutoshi had been in charge of constructing dog kennels outside Edo as part of Shogun Tokugawa Tsunayoshi's highly unpopular and ridiculed law against cruelty to animal and Sugutoshi reportedly fell into a rage on hearing that a ronin had broken into the kennel, slaughtering many dogs, which had resulted in the shogunate ordering the execution of a number of his retainers for negligence.

The domain was reduced to 100,000 koku, and transferred to a branch of the Echizen-Matsudaira clan whose ancestor was Yūki Hideyasu. In 1721, the second daimyō, Matsudaira Asagoro died at the age of 11 without heir. The shogunate agreed to allow a younger son of the daimyō of Shirakawa Nitta Domain to be posthumously adopted to secure the succession, but the kokudaka of the domain was halved to 50,000 koku. The prestige and also the ability of the domain to support its retainers was thus severely restricted, and the domain thereafter suffered from political and economic instability and frequent peasant uprisings. In 1765, the 5th daimyō, Matsudaira Yasuchika, opened a han school, the Kakuzankan (鶴山館), which lasted into the early Meiji period. The domain managed to restore its status to 100,000 koku when the 7th daimyō, Matsudaira Naritaka, adopted the 14th son of Shogun Tokugawa Ienari as his heir.Matsudaira Naritami was very active in the affairs of the Tokugawa family after 1868. Naritami was also known as Matsudaira Kakudō.

In the Bakumatsu period, the domain produced a number of doctors and rangaku scholars, including diplomat and legal scholar Tsuda Mamichi and future Prime Minister Hiranuma Kiichiro. In 1871, the domain became Tsuyama Prefecture due to the abolition of the han system. It was later incorporated into Okayama Prefecture via Hōjō Prefecture.

== Holdings at the end of the Edo period ==
As with most domains in the han system, Tsuyama Domain consisted of several discontinuous territories calculated to provide the assigned kokudaka, based on periodic cadastral surveys and projected agricultural yields, g.

- Mimasaka Province
  - 22 villages in Higashinanjō District
  - 3 villages in Aida District
  - 7 villages in Yoshino District
  - 45 villages in Shōnan District
  - 10 villages in Katsuhoku District
  - 26 villages in Nishisaijō District
  - 25 villages in Nishihōjō District
  - 25 villages in Tohokujō District
  - 10 villages in Kumehōjō District
  - 32 villages in Oba District
- Sanuki Province
  - 6 villages in Shōzu District
  - 3 villages in Aida District

In addition to the above, Tsuyama was in charge of administration of tenryō territories in Mimasaka: 7 villages in Tohokujō District, 27 villages in Oba District, and 32 villages in Saijō District.

== List of daimyō ==
#	Name	Tenure	Courtesy title	Court Rank	kokudaka
Mori clan, 1603-1697 (Tozama)
1	Mori Tadamasa (森忠政)	1603 - 1634	Sakon'e-gon-chūjō (左近衛権中将)	Junior 4th Rank, Upper Grade (従四位上)	186,500 koku
2	Mori Nagatsugu (森長継)	1634 - 1674	Dainaiki (大内記)	Junior 4th Rank, Lower Grade (従四位下)	186,500 koku
3	Mori Nagatake (森長武)	1674 - 1686	Hoki-no-kami (伯耆守)	Junior 4th Rank, Lower Grade (従四位下)	186,500 koku
4	Mori Naganari (森長成)	1686 - 1697	Mimasaka-no-kami (美作守); Jijū (侍従)	Junior 4th Rank, Lower Grade (従四位下)	186,500 koku
5	Mori Atsutoshi (森衆利)	1697 - 1697	-none-	-none-	186,500 koku
Echizen-Matsudaira clan, 1698-1871 (Shinpan)
1	Matsudaira Nobutomi (松平宣富)	1698 - 1721	Bizen-no-kami (備前守)	Junior 4th Rank, Lower Grade (従四位下)	100,000 koku
2	Matsudaira Asagoro (松平浅五郎)	1721 - 1726	none -	none -	100,000 koku
3	Matsudaira Nagahiro (松平長煕)	1726 - 1735	Echigo-no-kami (越後守)	Junior 4th Rank, Lower Grade (従四位下)	50,000 koku
4	Matsudaira Nagataka (松平長孝)	1735 - 1762	Echigo-no-kami (越後守); Jijū (侍従)	Junior 4th Rank, Lower Grade (従四位下)	50,000 koku
5	Matsudaira Yasuchika (松平康哉)	1762 - 1794	Echigo-no-kami (越後守); Jijū (侍従)	Junior 4th Rank, Lower Grade (従四位下)	50,000 koku
6	Matsudaira Yasuharu (松平康乂)	1794 - 1805	Echigo-no-kami (越後守)	Junior 4th Rank, Lower Grade (従四位下)	50,000 koku
7	Matsudaira Naritaka (松平斉孝)	1805 - 1831	Sakon'e-chūjō (左近衛中将)	Junior 4th Rank, Upper Grade (従四位上)	50,000 -> 100,000 koku
8	Matsudaira Naritami (松平斉民)	1831 - 1855	Echigo-no-kami (越後守); Sakon'e-no-chūshō (左近衛中将)	Senior 4th Rank, Upper Grade (正四位上)	100,000 koku
9	Matsudaira Yoshitomo (松平慶倫)	1855 - 1871	Echigo-no-kami (越後守); Sakon'e-no-chūshō (左近衛中将)	Senior 4th Rank, Lower Grade (正四位下)	100,000 koku

=== Simplified genealogy (Matsudaira) ===
- Tokugawa Ieyasu, 1st Tokugawa shōgun (1543–1616; r. 1603–1605)
  - Yūki (Matsudaira) Hideyasu, 1st daimyō of Fukui (1574–1607)
    - Naomoto, Lord of Himeji (1604–1648)
      - Naonori, daimyō of Shirakawa (1642–1695)
        - I. Nobutomi, 1st daimyō of Tsuyama (cr. 1698) (1680–1721; daimyō of Tsuyama: 1698–1721)
          - II. Asagorō, 2nd daimyō of Tsuyama (1716–1726; r. 1721–1726)
        - Chikakiyo, daimyō of Shirakawa (1682–1721)
          - III. Nagahiro, 3rd daimyō of Tsuyama (1720–1735; r. 1726–1735)
    - Naomasa, 1st daimyō of Matsue (1601–1666)
      - Chikayoshi, 1st daimyō of Hirose (1632–1717)
        - Chikatoki, 2nd daimyō of Hirose (1659–1702)
          - Chikatomo, 3rd daimyō of Hirose (1681–1728)
            - IV. Nagataka, 4th daimyō of Tsuyama (1725–1762; r. 1735–1762)
              - V. Yasuchika, 5th daimyō of Tsuyama (1752–1794; r. 1762–1794)
                - VI. Yasuharu, 6th daimyō of Tsuyama (1786–1805; r. 1794–1805)
                - VII. Naritaka, 7th daimyō of Tsuyama (1788–1838; r. 1805–1831)
                  - IX. Yoshitomi, 9th daimyō of Tsuyama (1827–1871; Lord: 1855–1869; Governor: 1869–1871)
  - Tokugawa Yorinobu, 1st daimyō of Kishū (1602–1671)
    - Tokugawa Mitsusada, 2nd daimyō of Kishū (1627–1705)
      - Tokugawa Yoshimune, 8th Tokugawa shōgun (1684–1751; 5th Lord of Kishū: 1705–1716; 8th Tokugawa shōgun: 1716–1745)
        - Tokugawa Munetada, 1st Hitotsubashi-Tokugawa family head (1721–1765)
          - Tokugawa Harusada, 2nd Hitotsubashi-Tokugawa family head (1751–1827)
            - Tokugawa Ienari, 11th Tokugawa shōgun (1773–1841; r. 1786–1837)
              - VIII. Matsudaira Naritami, 8th daimyō of Tsuyama (1814–1891; r. 1831–1855)

== See also ==
- Abolition of the han system
- List of Han
