= Mimasaka Province =

Former province of Japan

An 1868 map of Japanese provinces, with Mimasaka highlighted

Mimasaka Province (美作国, Mimasaka no Kuni; Japanese pronunciation: [mʲì.mä́.sä̀.kä̀ (nò̞ kɯ̈̀.ɲ̟ì)]) was a province of Japan in the area that is northern Okayama Prefecture in the Chūgoku region of western Japan. Mimasaka bordered Bitchū, Bizen, Harima, Hōki, and Inaba Provinces. Its abbreviated form name was Sakushū (作州). In terms of the Gokishichidō system, Mimasaka was one of the provinces of the San'yō circuit.

Under the Engishiki classification system, Mimasaka was ranked as one of the 35 "superior countries" (上国) in terms of importance, and one of the "near countries" (近国) in terms of distance from the capital. The provincial capital was located in what is now the city of Tsuyama.

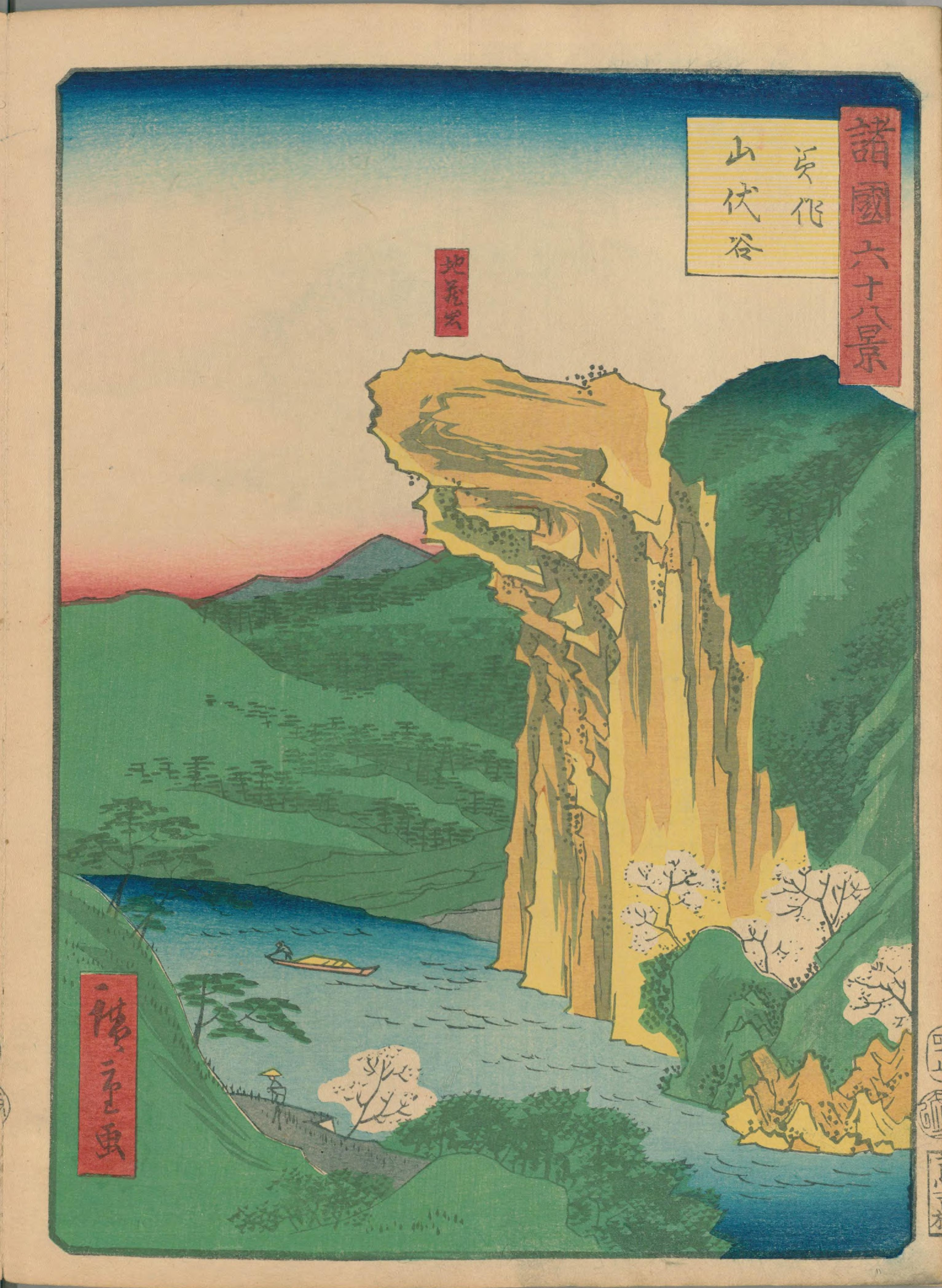
Hiroshige ukiyo-e "Mimasaka" in "The Famous Scenes of the Sixty States" (六十余州名所図会)

== Geography ==
Mimasaka was a landlocked province on the southern side of the Chugoku Mountains. The area is very mountainous, and is divided into three major river basins. In the east is the Asahi River which flows through the Maniwa Basin. In the center is the Yoshii River, which flows through the Tsuyama Basin. To the west is the Mimasaka area, which contains three smaller river basins. Due to this geography, the main transportation method in pre-modern times was by boat.

== History ==
In 713, at the suggestion of Bizen-no-kami Nanten - and Bizen-no-suke Kamitsukeno-no-Kenji the Eita, Katsuta, Tomata, Kume, Mashima, and Oba districts of Bizen Province were separated into a new province, and, and Kamitsukeno-no-Kenji was appointed as the first governor of Mimasaka. This separation was the final stage of the disintegration of the former Kingdom of Kibi, and was intended to further weaken the Kibi clan by putting its iron resources directly under the control of the imperial government.

In Mimasaka, there are many place names that are directly linked to people or places in Yamato. The ruins of the kokufu have been located within what is now the city of Tsuyama. The site is now located under the Tsuyama Sōja shrine. The Mimasaka Kokubun-ji and the ruins of the Mimasaka Kokubun-niji as located nearby, The ichinomiya of the province is the Nakayama Shrine, also located in Tsuyama.

During the Heian period, the area was part of the holdings of the Heike clan. In the Kamakura period, Kajiwara no Kagetoki followed by Wada Yoshimori served as shugo before the province came under the direct control of the Hōjō clan. In the Muromachi period, the Ashikaga clan took over the former Hōjō holdings. No central powerful local clan ever rose to prominence and the province changed hands frequently between warring factions in the Sengoku period.

Control shifted between the Yamana clan, the Akamatsu clan, the Amago clan, the Urakami clan, and the Ukita clan. After the Battle of Sekigahara in 1600, it became united again with Bizen Province under Kobayakawa Hideaki. After his death without heir only two years later, the Tokugawa shogunate assigned most of the province to the Mori clan as Tsuyama Domain. The Mori moved the capital of the province from the Innoshō area, to their newly built jōkamachi at Tsuyama.

In 1697, the Mori clan were replaced by a cadet branch of the Echizen-Matsudaira clan. The size of the domain was reduced to only 100,000 koku, and later to 50,000 koku. In 1767, another domain, Katsuyama Domain, with 23,000 koku, was created for the Miura clan. Mimasaka was the home of the samurai Miyamoto Musashi, the author of The Book of Five Rings.

In 1871, following the abolition of the han system, Mimasaka was divided into Tsuyama, Mashima, Kurashiki, Tsuruta, Koromo, Koga, Ikuno, Akashi, Numata, and Tatsuno prefectures, which were merged with Okayama Prefecture inI 1876. Per the early Meiji period Kyudaka kyuryo Torishirabe-chō (旧高旧領取調帳), an official government assessment of the nation's resources, the province had 766 villages, with a total kokudaka of 263,477 koku.

Bakumatsu period domains
Name	Clan	Type	kokudaka
Tsuyama	Echizen-Matsudaira clan	Shinpan	100,000 koku
Katsuyama	Miura clan	Fudai	23,000 koku

Districts of Mimasaka Province
District	kokudaka	Controlled by	at present	Comments
Aida District (英田郡)	13,662 koku	65 villages (51 Numata Domain, 11 tenryō, 3 Tsuyama Domain)	absorbed Yoshino District on April 1, 1900	
Kumehokujō District (久米北条郡)	28,871 koku	60 villages (22 tenryō, 17 Hamada Domain, 11 Komoro Domain, 9 Tsuyama Domain, 1 Komoro/Tsuyama)	merged with Kumenanjō District to become Kume District (久米郡) on April 1, 1890	
Kumenanjō District (久米南条郡)	22,989 koku	72 villages (28 tenryō, 28 Koga Domain, 14 Tsuyama Domain, 1 Koga/Tsuyama, 1 tenryō/Tsuyama)	merged with Kumehokujō District to become Kume District on April 1, 1890	
Mashima District (真島郡)	33,225 koku	112 villages (107 Katsuyama Domain, 5 Tatsuno Domain)	merged with Ōba District to become Maniwa District (真庭郡) on April 1, 1890	
Ōba District (大庭郡)	20,836 koku	59 villages (32 Tsuyama Domain, 26 tenryō, 1 Tsuyama/tenryō)	merged with Mashima District to become Maniwa District on April 1, 1890	
Saihokujō District (西北条郡)	11,582 koku	34 villages 25 Tsuyama Domain, 9 tenryō)	merged with Saisaijō, Tōhokujō and Tōnanjō Districts to become Tomata District (苫田郡) on April 1, 1890	
Saisaijō District (西西条郡)	27,308 koku	61 villages (33 Tsuyama Domain, 32 tenryō)	merged with Saihokujō, Tōhokujō and Tōnanjō Districts to become Tomata District on April 1, 1890	
Shōboku District (勝北郡)	34,189 koku	89 villages (57 tenryō, 16 Tsuchiura Domain,10 Tsuyama Domain, 6 Numata Domain)	merged with Shōnan District to become Katsuta District (勝田郡) on April 1, 1890	
Shōnan District (勝南郡)	24,657 koku	79 villages (45 Tsuyama Domain, 31 tenryō, 3 Numata Domain)	merged with Shōboku District to become Katsuta District on April 1, 1890	
Tōhokujō District (東北条郡)	15,411 koku	40 villages (26 Tsuyama Domain, 15 tenryō)	merged with Saihokujō, Saisaijō and Tōnanjō Districts to become Tomata District on April 1, 1890	
Tōnanjō District (東南条郡)	10,838 koku	22 villages (22 Tsuyama Domain)	merged with Saihokujō, Saisaijō and Tōhokujō Districts to become Tomata District on April 1, 1890	
Yoshino District (吉野郡)	19,954 koku	73 villages (43 Akashi Domain, 19 tenryō, 7 Tsuyama Domain, 3 Tsuchiura Domain)	merged into Aida District on April 1, 1900	

== Gallery ==
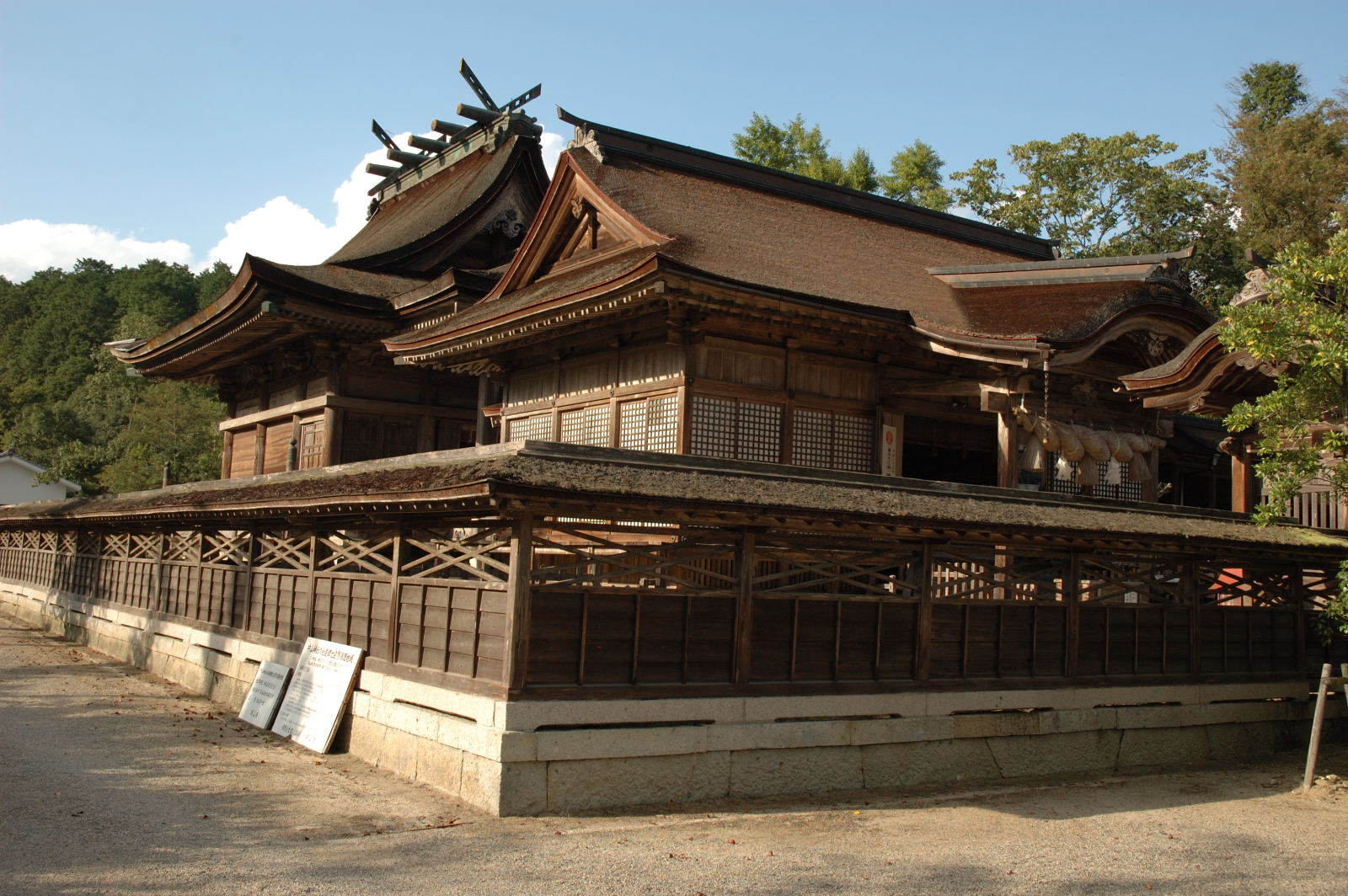
Nakayama Jinja, the ichinomiya of the province

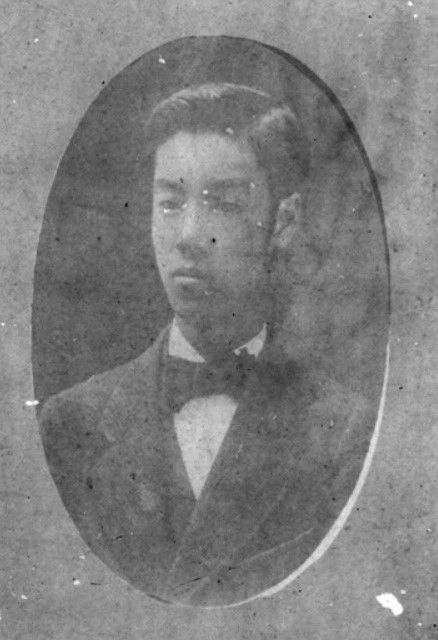
Matsudaira Yoshitomo, last daimyō of Tsushima

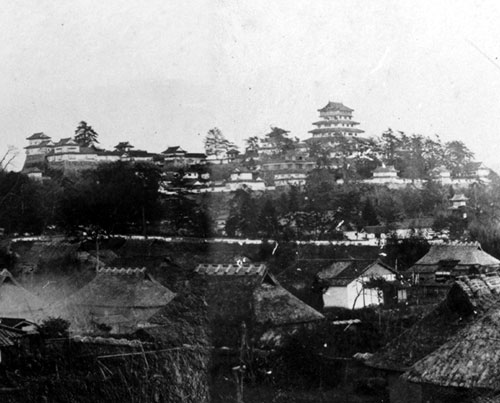
Tsuyama Castle in 1873

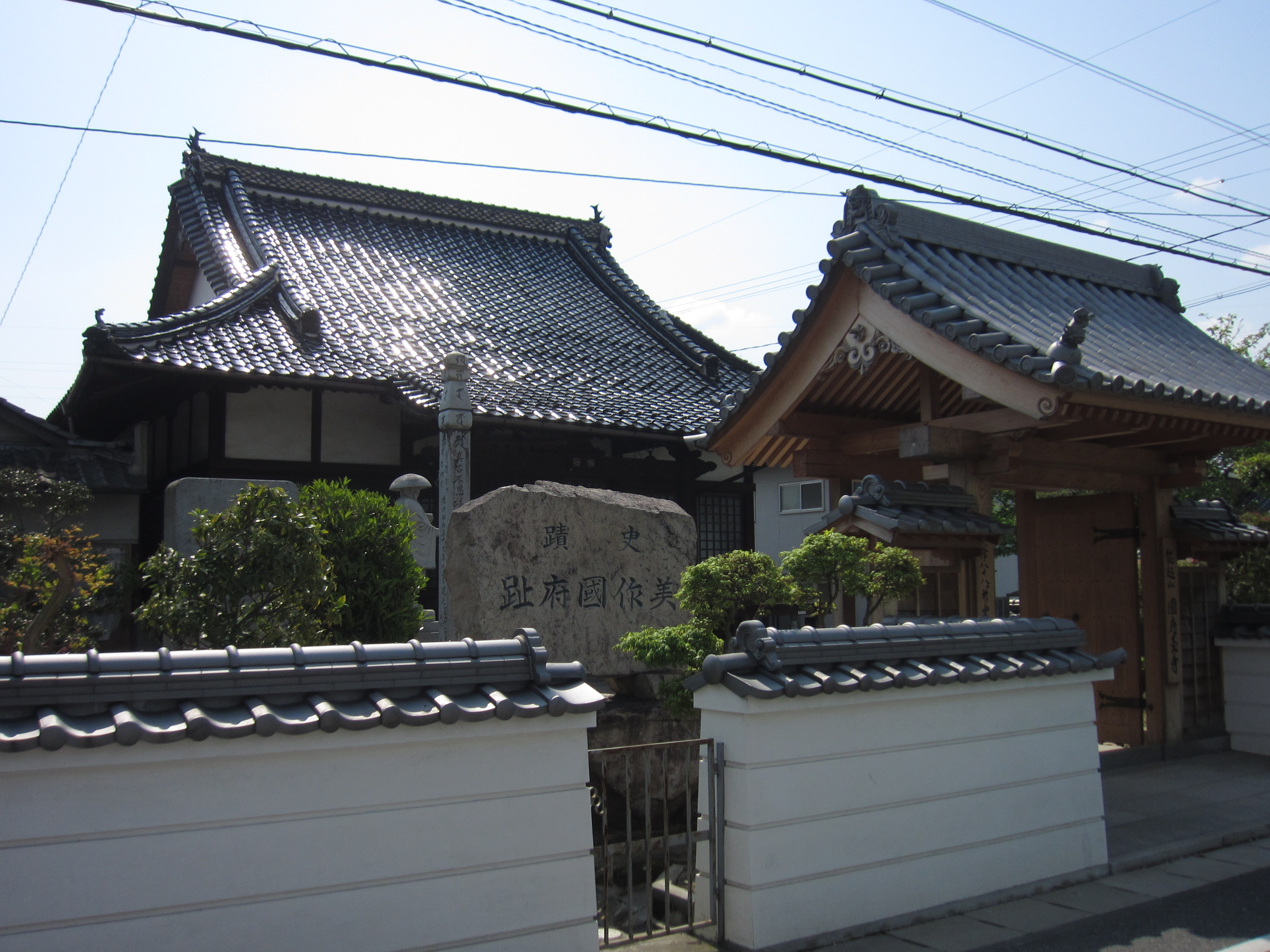
Site of the Mimasaka Kokufu
