= Akashi Takenori =

Japanese samurai (1566–1618?)

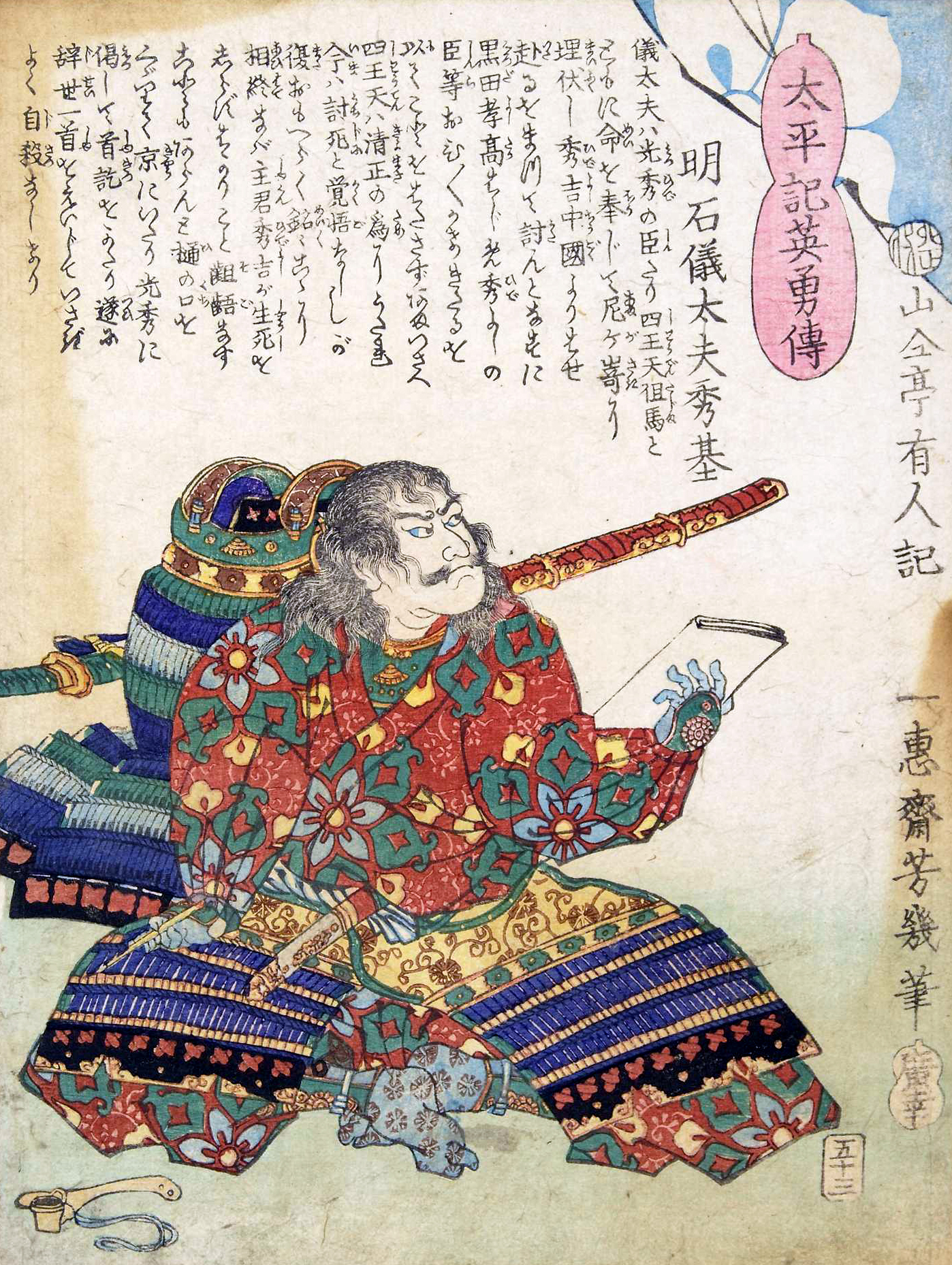
Akashi Takenori

Akashi Takenori (明石 全登; 1566–1618?) was a Japanese samurai of the Azuchi-Momoyama through early Edo periods. Also known as Teruzumi, Zentō, or Naritoyo. Retainer of Ukita Naoie, the major daimyō of Bizen Province. Also known by his court title, Kamon-no-Kami (掃部頭).

Takenori also served as a strategist under Naoie's son Ukita Hideie. At the Battle of Sekigahara, he fought bravely against Fukushima Masanori. After the Ukita clan had been destroyed in the Battle of Sekigahara, Takenori lived in Akizuki.

At the Siege of Osaka, Akashi entered Osaka castle and he fought against Tokugawa Ieyasu to the last minute. His mother, Monica, accompanied him to Osaka, and worked as a nurse throughout the siege. After the castle's fall, Takenori escaped again. He never committed suicide because of his Christian beliefs. Despite being hunted by the forces of Tokugawa Ieyasu, he was not caught; his whereabouts after the battle are unknown.

Several Tokugawa family traditions, including the Tokugawa Jikki, the Tsuchiya Tomosada Shiki, and the Ishikawa clan Records has stated that Takenori was slain in the battle. The Osaka Gojin Memorandum state that his head was taken by Tei Sanemon, a retainer of Mizuno Katsunari.
