= Kibitsuhiko Shrine =

Shinto shrine in Okayama Prefecture, Japan

Kibitsuhiko Jinja 吉備津彦神社
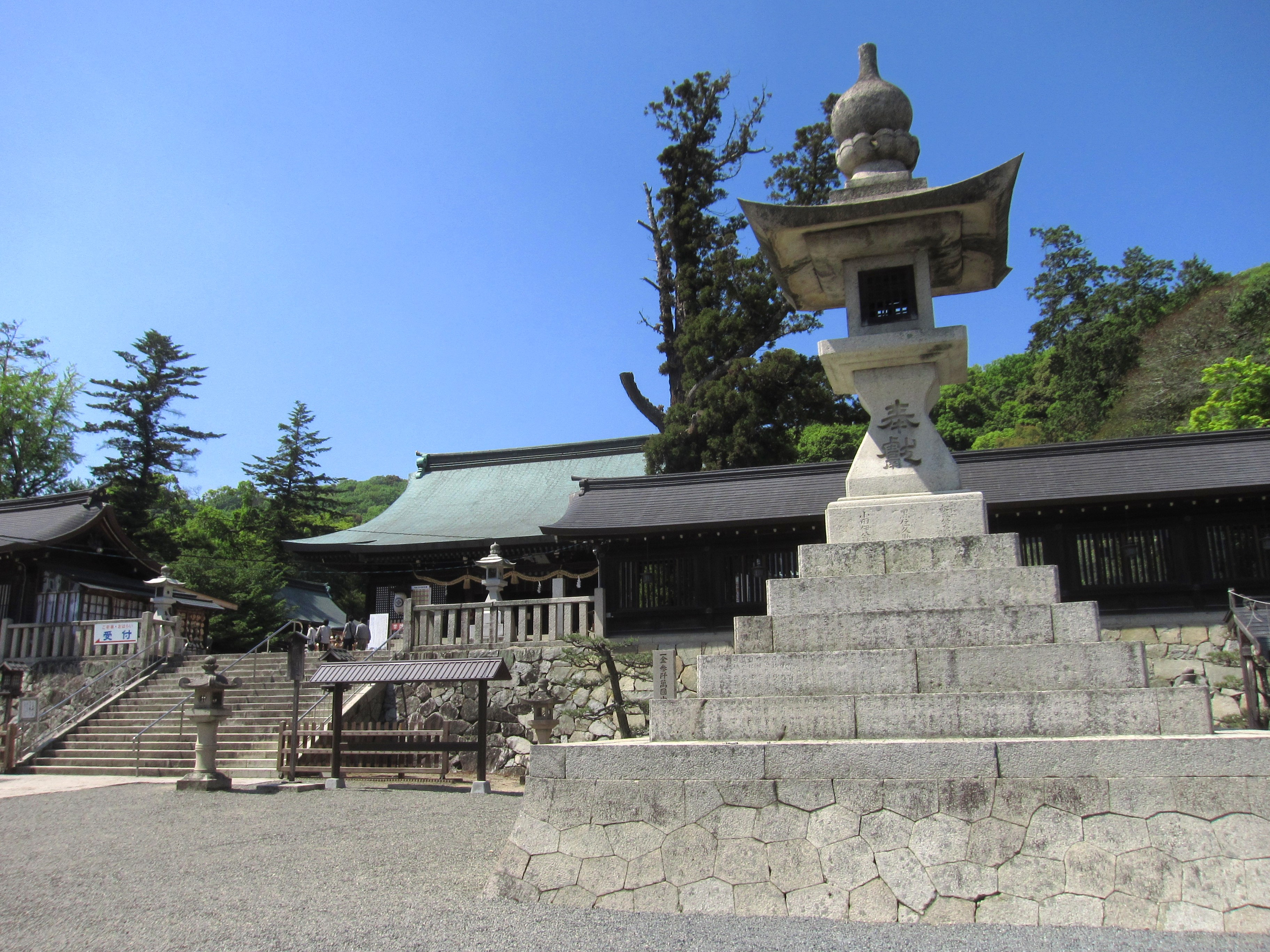
- Haiden and Stone lantern of Kibitsuhiko Jinja

- Kibitsuhiko Jinja Kibitsuhiko Shrine (Japan)

Religion
- Affiliation: Shinto
- Deity: Kibitsuhiko-no-mikoto
- Festival: third weekend of October

Location
- Location: 1043 Ichinomiya, Kita-ku, Okayama-shi, Okayama-ken 701-1211
- Interactive map of Kibitsuhiko Jinja 吉備津彦神社
- Coordinates: 34°40′36.31″N 133°51′49.87″E

Website
- Official website

Kibitsuhiko Jinja (吉備津彦神社) is a Shinto shrine in the Ichinomiya neighborhood of the city of Okayama in Okayama Prefecture, Japan. It is the ichinomiya of former Bizen Province. The main festival of the shrine is held annually on the third weekend of October. The shrine is also known in literature as the Asahi-no-miya (朝日の宮).

== Location ==
Kibitsuhiko Jinja is situated at the northeastern foot of Mount Kibi no Nakayama (吉備の中山, Kibi no Naka-yama) in Okayama. Kibitsu Jinja is situated at the mountain's northwestern foot. The headquarters of Kurozumikyō is located on the mountain's summit.

Kibitsuhiko Jinja is located within close walking distance of Bizen-Ichinomiya Station.

== Enshrined kami ==
The kami enshrined at Kibitsuhiko Jinja are:

- Kibitsuhiko-no-mikoto (吉備津彦命), the son of Emperor Kōrei and conqueror of the Kingdom of Kibi
- Wakatakehiko-no-mikoto (稚武彦命), younger brother or son of Kibitsuhiko
- Emperor Kōrei (孝霊天皇)
- Emperor Kōgen (孝元天皇)
- Emperor Kaika (開化天皇)
- Emperor Sujin (崇神天皇)
- Hikosashikatawake-no-mikoto (彦刺肩別命), brother of Kibitsuhiko
- Amatarashi-hiko Kunioshi-hito no mikoto (天足彦国押人命)
- Yamato-totohimo-moso-hime-no-mikoto (倭迹迹日百襲姫命), elder sister of Kibitsuhiko
- Ōyamato-totohiwakaya-hime-no-mikoto (大倭迹々日稚屋比売命), younger sister of Kibitsuhiko
- Kanayamahiko-no-kami (金山彦大神), elder sister of Kibitsuhiko
- Ōyamakuni-no-kami (大山咋神)

== History ==
The origins of Kibitsuhiko Jinja are uncertain. According to the shrine's legend', it was during the reign of Empress Suiko, and was the site of Kibitsuhiko-no-Mikoto's residence; but the shrine does not appear in any historical documentation until the late Heian period. It is not listed in the early Heian period Engishiki and instead Ani Shrine was given the rank of Myojin Taisha (名神大社) and the rank of ichinomiya of the province. However, Ani Jinja sided with Fujiwara no Sumitomo in his revolt from 939 to 941 and was thus demoted. On the other hand, Kibitsu Shrine, the parent shrine of the Kibitsuhiko Jinja wrote prayers for the victory of imperial forces over Fujiwara no Sumitomo, and was thus rewarded by having their branch shrine in Bizen raised to become the ichinomiya. During the Sengoku period, the shrine was burned down by the Matsuda clan, but was restored with the support of Ukita Naoie. Toyotomi Hideyoshi prayed here for victory prior to his attack on Takamatsu Castle.

In the Edo period, Ikeda Toshitaka, the daimyō of Himeji Domain and the lord of Okayama Castle, rebuilt the shrine, and successive rulers of Okayama Domain sponsored various repairs and reconstructions. After the Meiji Restoration, the shrine was listed as a Prefecture Shrine, and was promoted to a National Shrine, 3rd rank (国幣小社, Kokuhei Shosha) in 1928.In December 1930, the main shrine and most other structures (with the exception of the Zuijinmon Gate) burned down due to accident. The shrine buildings that can be seen today were completed in 1936.

The shrine is a three-minute walk from Bizen-Ichinomiya Station on the JR West Kibi Line.

== Cultural Properties ==
=== National Important Cultural Properties ===
- Tachi sword (太刀 銘（菊紋), Edo Period (1678). Signed by Ikeda Shinkai, this sword was donation to the shrine by Ikeda Tsunamasa, It is now kept at the Okayama Prefectural Museum.

=== National Intangible Folk Cultural Properties ===
- Kibitsuhiko Jinja rice planting festival (吉備津彦神社の御田植祭).

=== Okayama Prefecture Designated Tangible Cultural Properties ===
- Honden (吉備津彦神社 本殿), Edo period (1697); rebuilt by Ikeda Tsunamasa, daimyo the Okayama domain. It measures three bays across and two bays deep, with a cypress bark roof in the Nagare-zukuri style. It is surrounded by a veranda with a balustrade and a three-bay wooden floor at the front. The eaves are made of thick rafters, the joinery is made of two-fingered beams, and between the saddle-shaped pillarsare toad-shaped slats carved with the chrysanthemum and five-seven paulownia crests, which are supported by accordion supports. The interior is divided into an outer sanctuary (one bay in front) and an inner sanctuary (one bay in back). The floor is raised and houses the altar.
- Emaki of Shinto rituals (紙本淡彩神事絵巻), Muromachi period (1469-1486); This picture scroll depicts a sacred ritual (Ota-Uematsuri) held at Kibitsuhiko Shrine in the Middle Ages. It is primarily ink-colored, with a touch of pale pink and pale blue. It measures 23.3 cm tall and 260.0 cm wide.

== Gallery ==
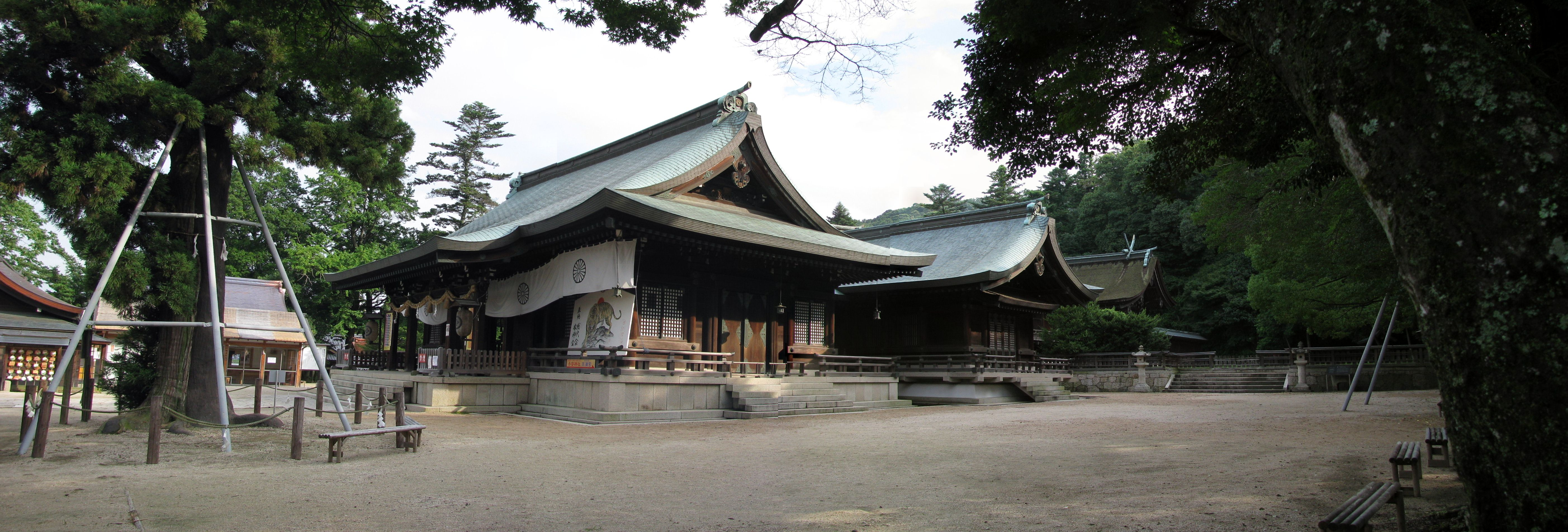
Panorama

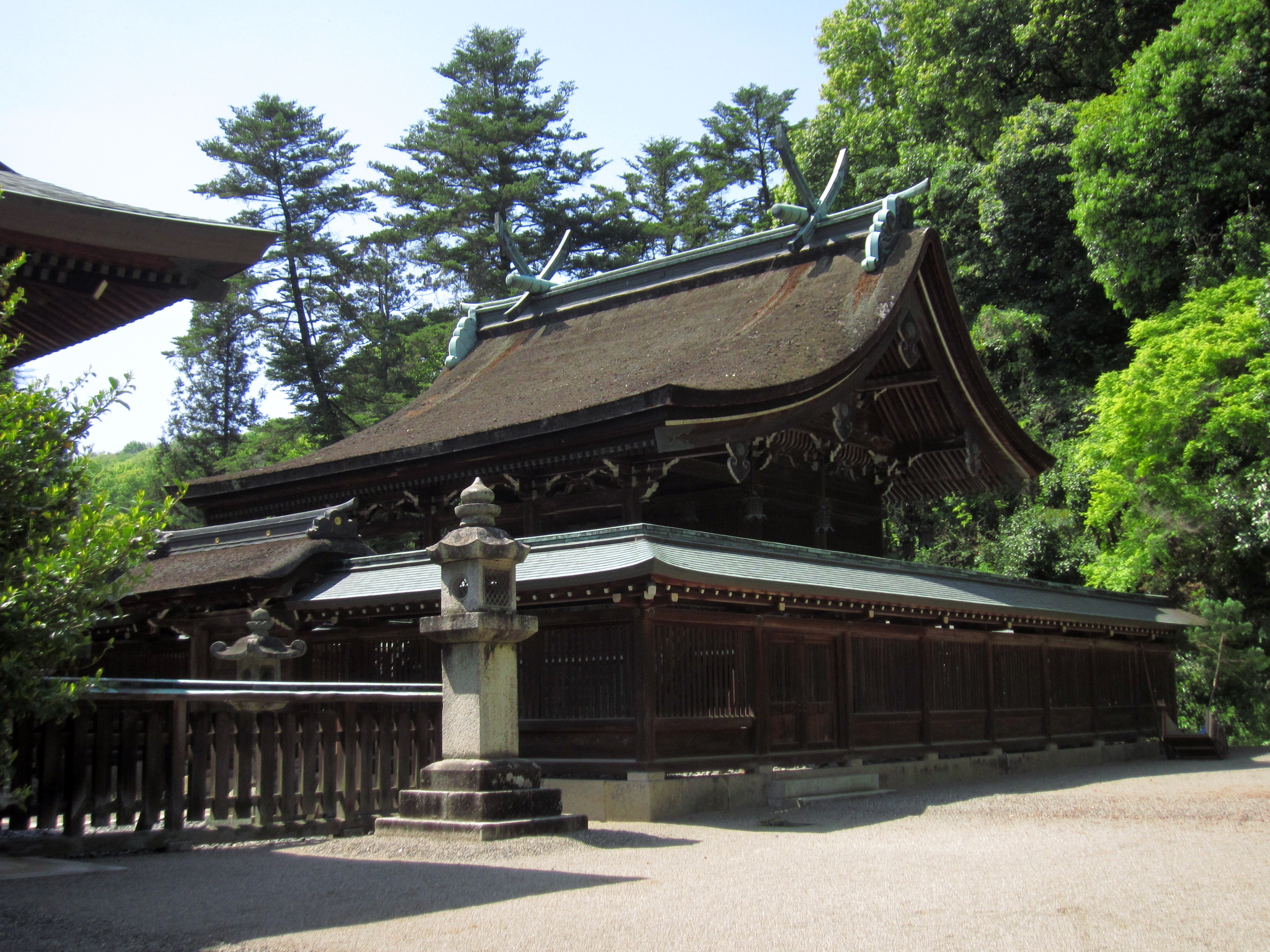
Honden（Okayama P.ICP）

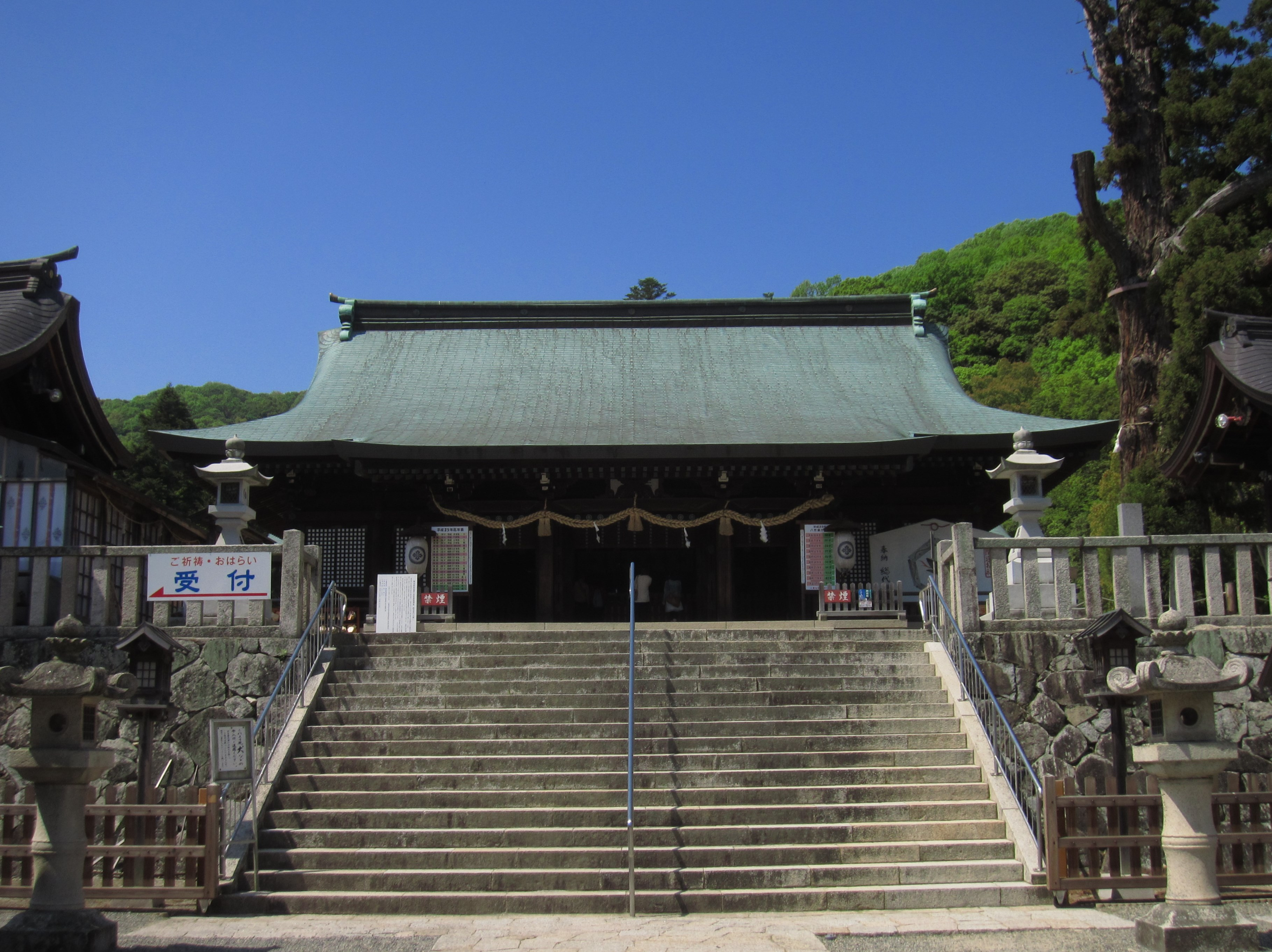
Haiden

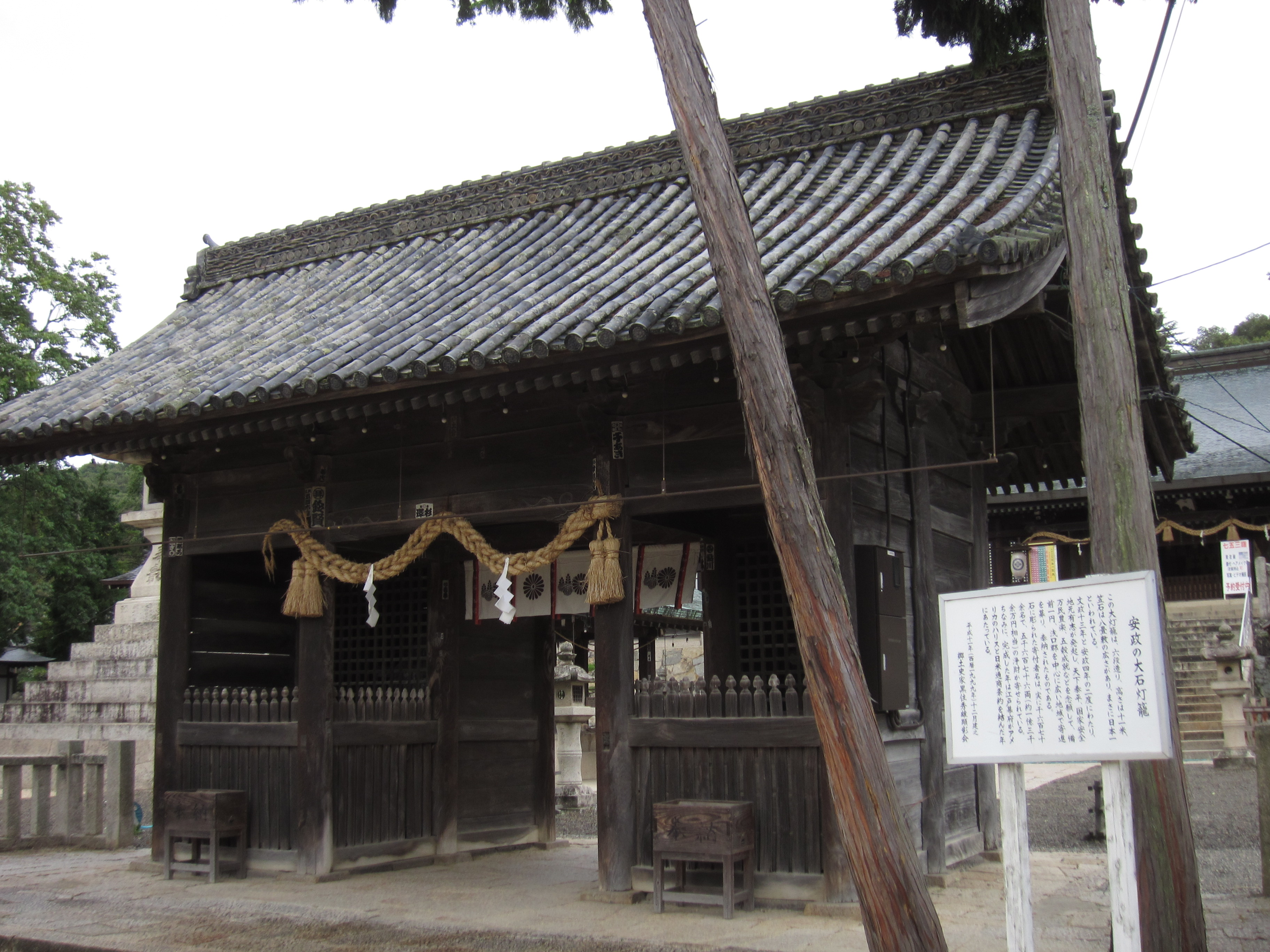
Zuishin-mon（Okayama C.ICP）

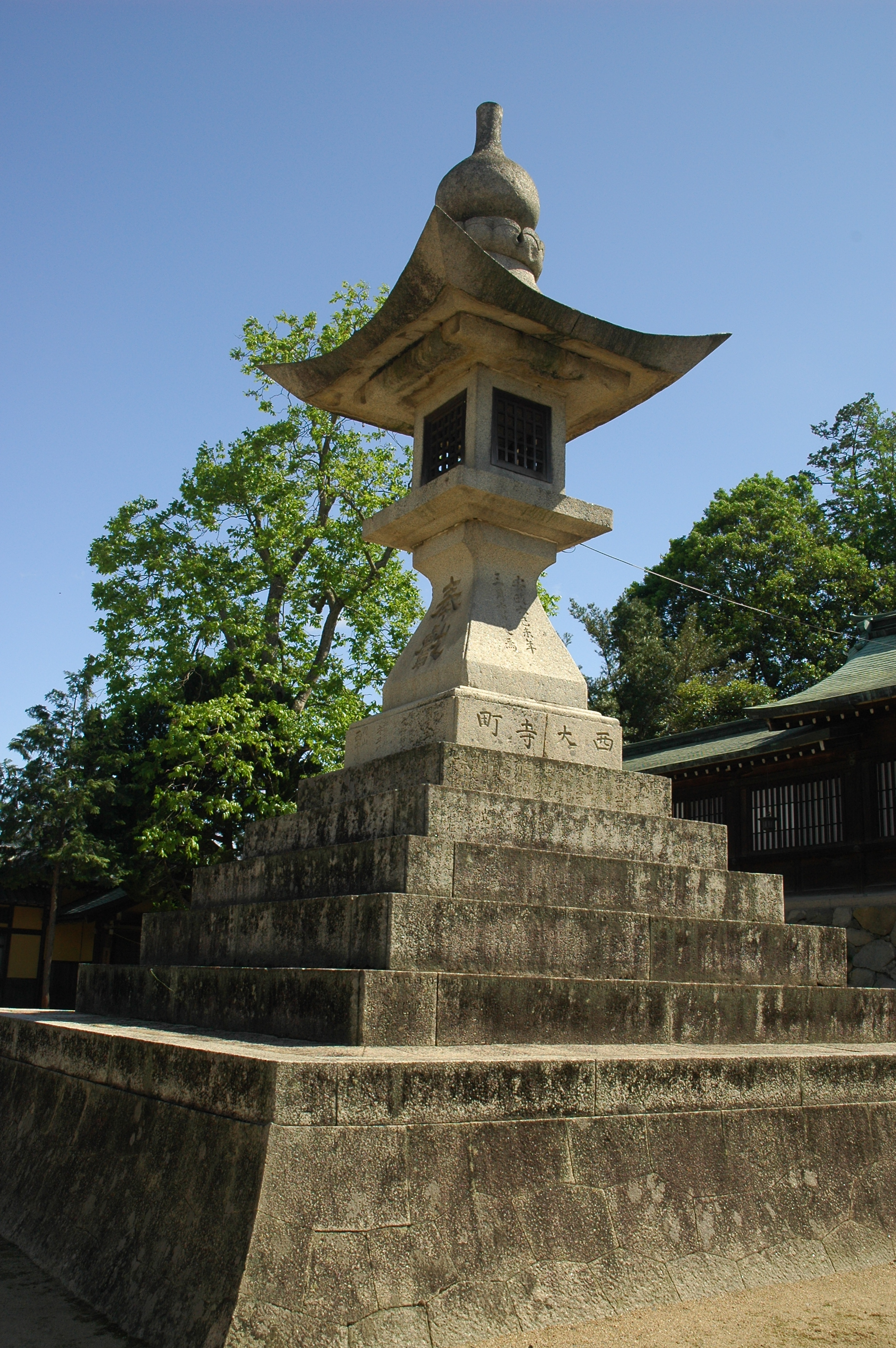
Stone tōrō lantern（Okayama C.ICP）

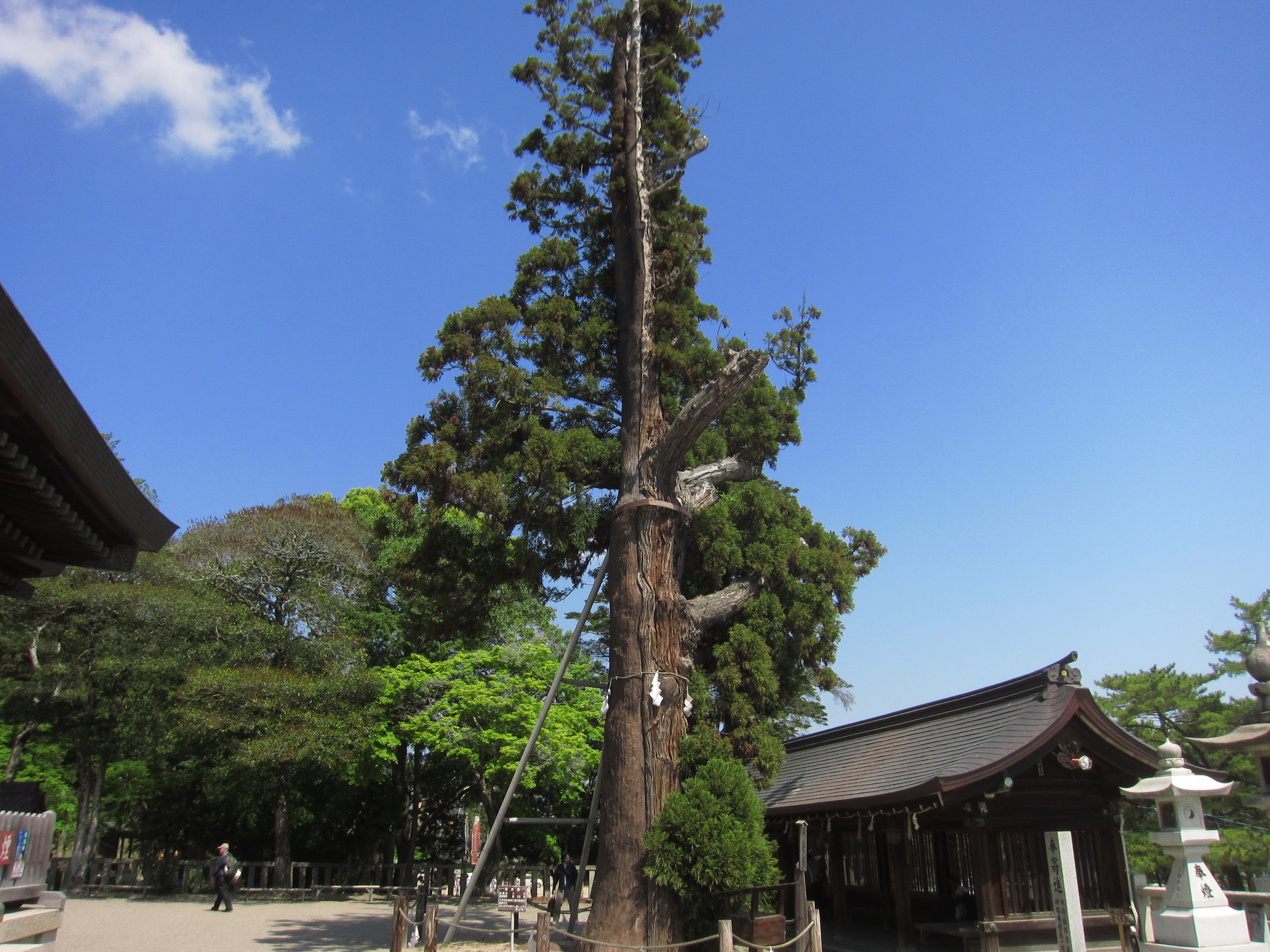
Peace Sugi

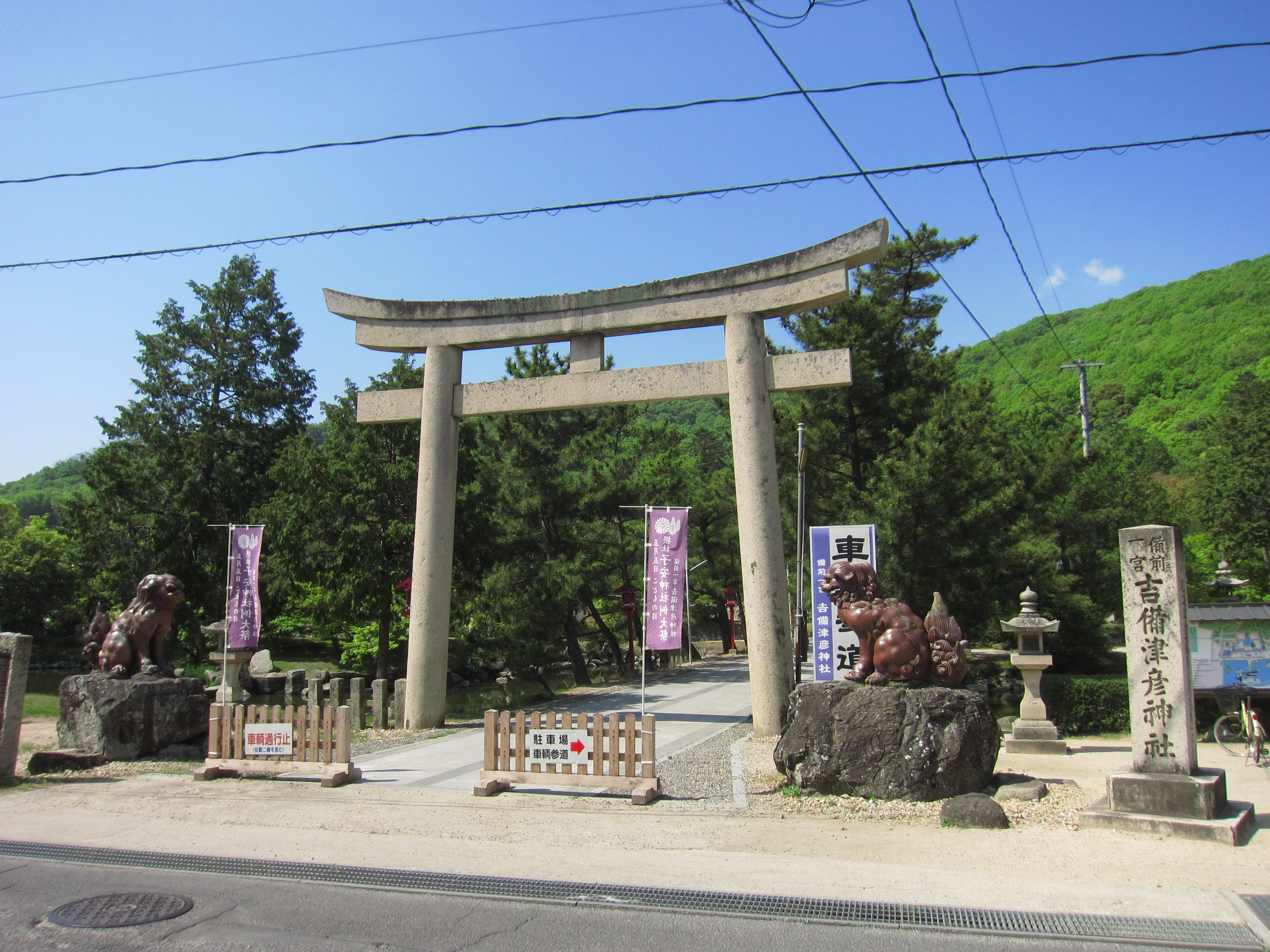
Torii

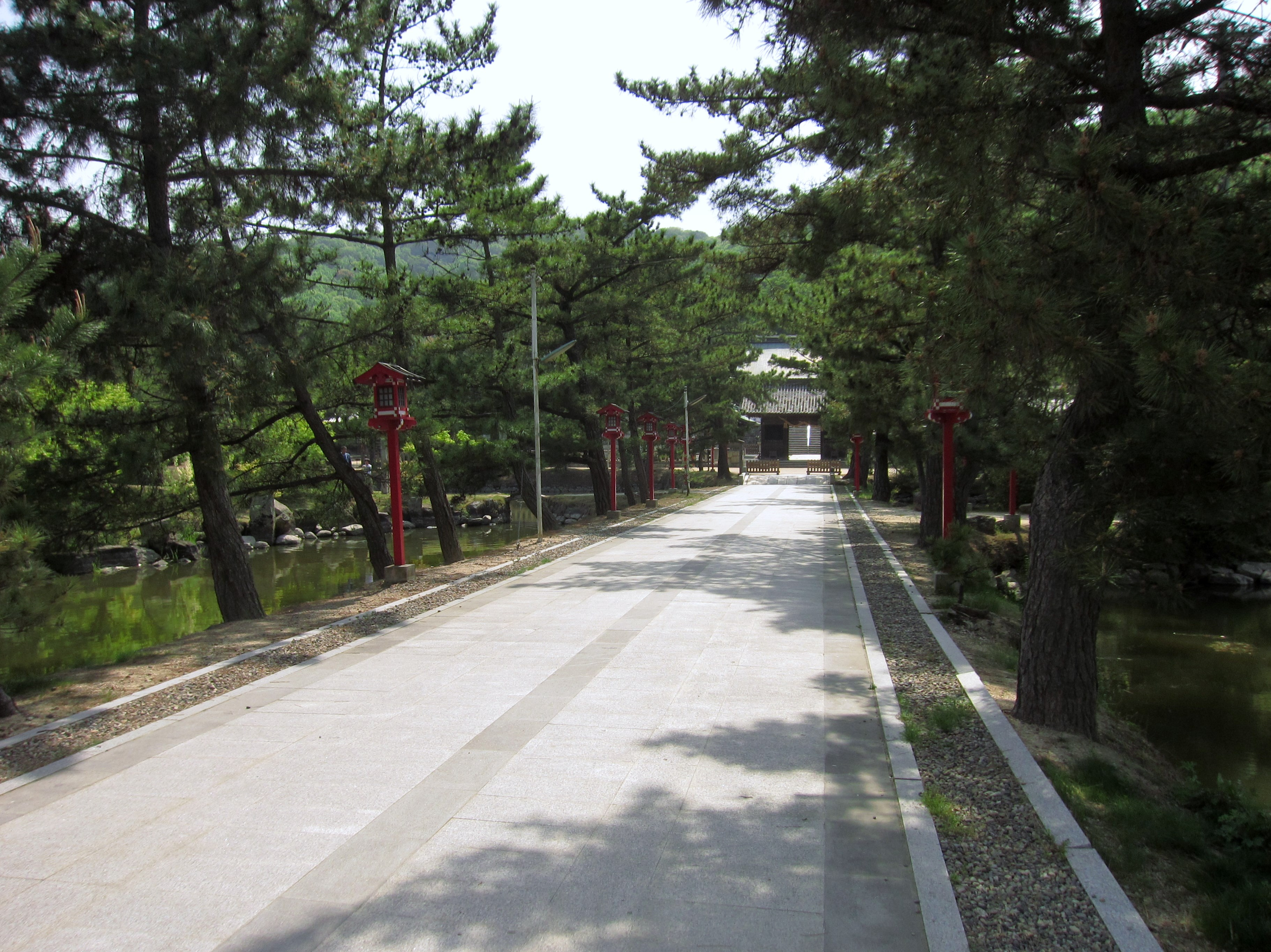
Approach

== See also ==
- Ichinomiya
- Kibitsu Shrine (Bitchū)
