= Togawa Hideyasu =

Japanese samurai (1538–1596)

- 戸川 秀安
- Born: 1538; Bizen Province
- Died: October 16, 1596 (aged 57–58)
- Military career
- Rank: Commander
- Commands: Tsuneyama Castle; Hayashino Castle
- Conflicts: Battle of Kizugawaguchi

Togawa Hideyasu (戸川 秀安; 1538 – 1596) was a Japanese samurai and commander of the Sengoku period. He was one of the most important vassals of the Ukita clan. Hideyasu was the castle lord in command of Tsuneyama castle and Hayashino Castle.

His mother was a wet nurse of Ukita Naoie's younger brother Ukita Tadaie. His son Togawa Michiyasu also served the Ukita clan but he left Ukita clan when Ukita family feuds happened in 1599. In the Battle of Sekigahara, Michiyasu belonged to the West squad. After the battle he was given a small territory in Bizen Province and founded Niwase Domain.

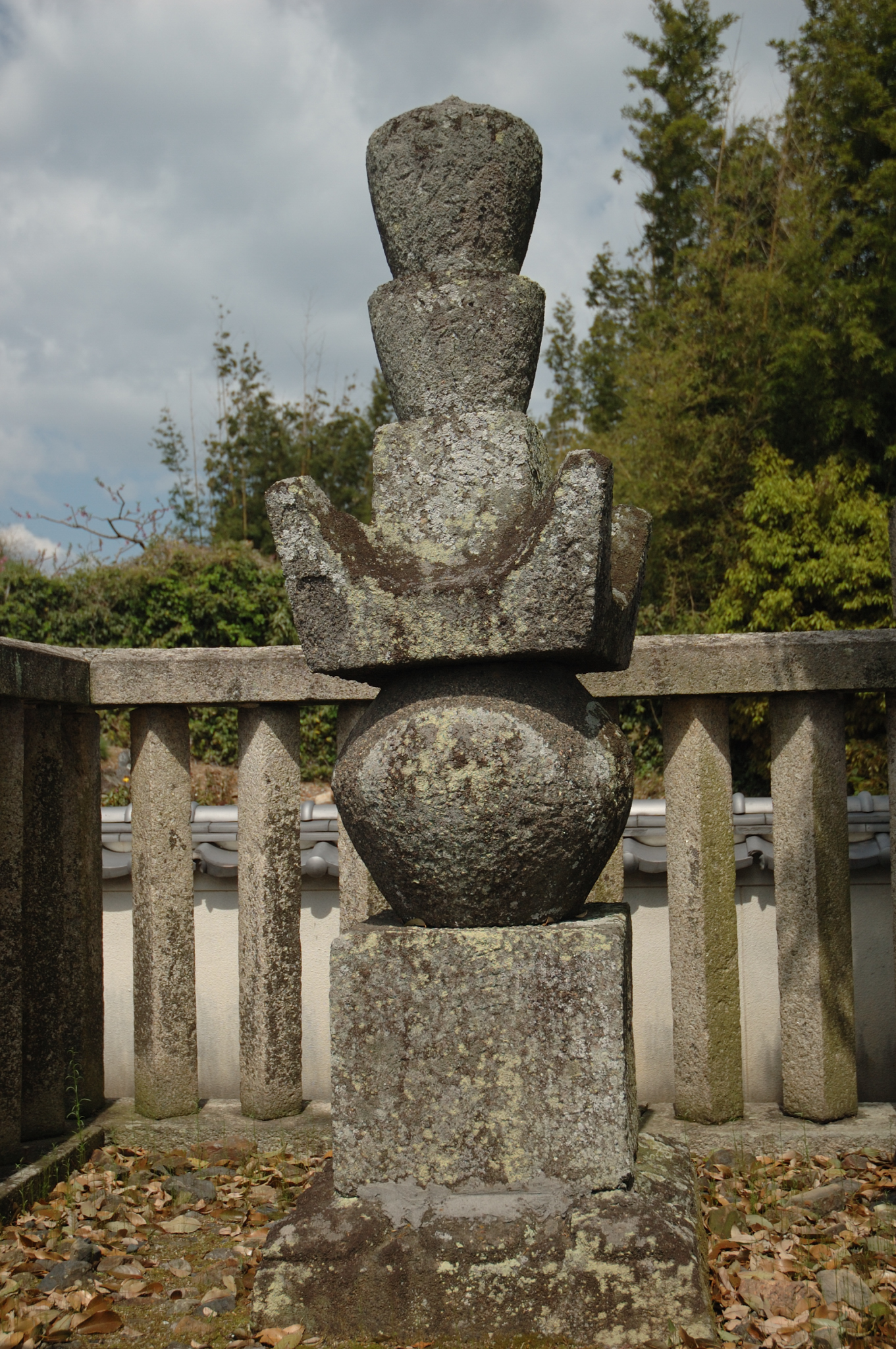
Hideyasu's Tomb
