= Hanabusa Masayuki =

Japanese samurai

Hanafusa Masayoshi (花房 正幸, 1524 - 1605) was a Japanese samurai of the Sengoku period through early Edo period, who served the Ukita clan (Ukita Naoie and Ukita Hideie) as a senior retainer. He was the castle lord in command of Mushiage Castle.
