= Kameyama Castle =

Kameyama Castle (亀山城, Kameyama-jō) is the name of many castles in Japan.

- Kameyama Castle (Aichi) in Shinshiro, Aichi Prefecture (formerly Mikawa Province)
- Kameyama Castle (Mie) in Kameyama, Mie Prefecture (formerly Ise Province)
- Kameyama Castle (Kyoto) in Kameoka, Kyoto Prefecture (formerly Tanba Province)
- Kameyama Castle (Okayama) in Okayama, Okayama Prefecture (formerly Bizen Province)
- Kameyama Castle (Wakayama) in Gobō, Wakayama Prefecture (formerly Kii Province)
- Kameyama Castle (Yamaguchi) in Nagato, Yamaguchi Prefecture (formerly Nagato Province)

Kameyama Castle is also an alternate name for the following castles:

- Ōno Castle (Echizen Province) in Ōno, Fukui Prefecture (formerly Echizen Province)
- Marugame Castle in Marugame, Kagawa Prefecture (formerly Sanuki Province)
- Hamada Castle in Hamada, Shimane Prefecture (formerly Iwami Province)
- Tsuzurao Castle in Tottori, Tottori Prefecture (formerly Inaba Province)
