= Inryō-ji =

Buddhist temple in Okayama, Japan

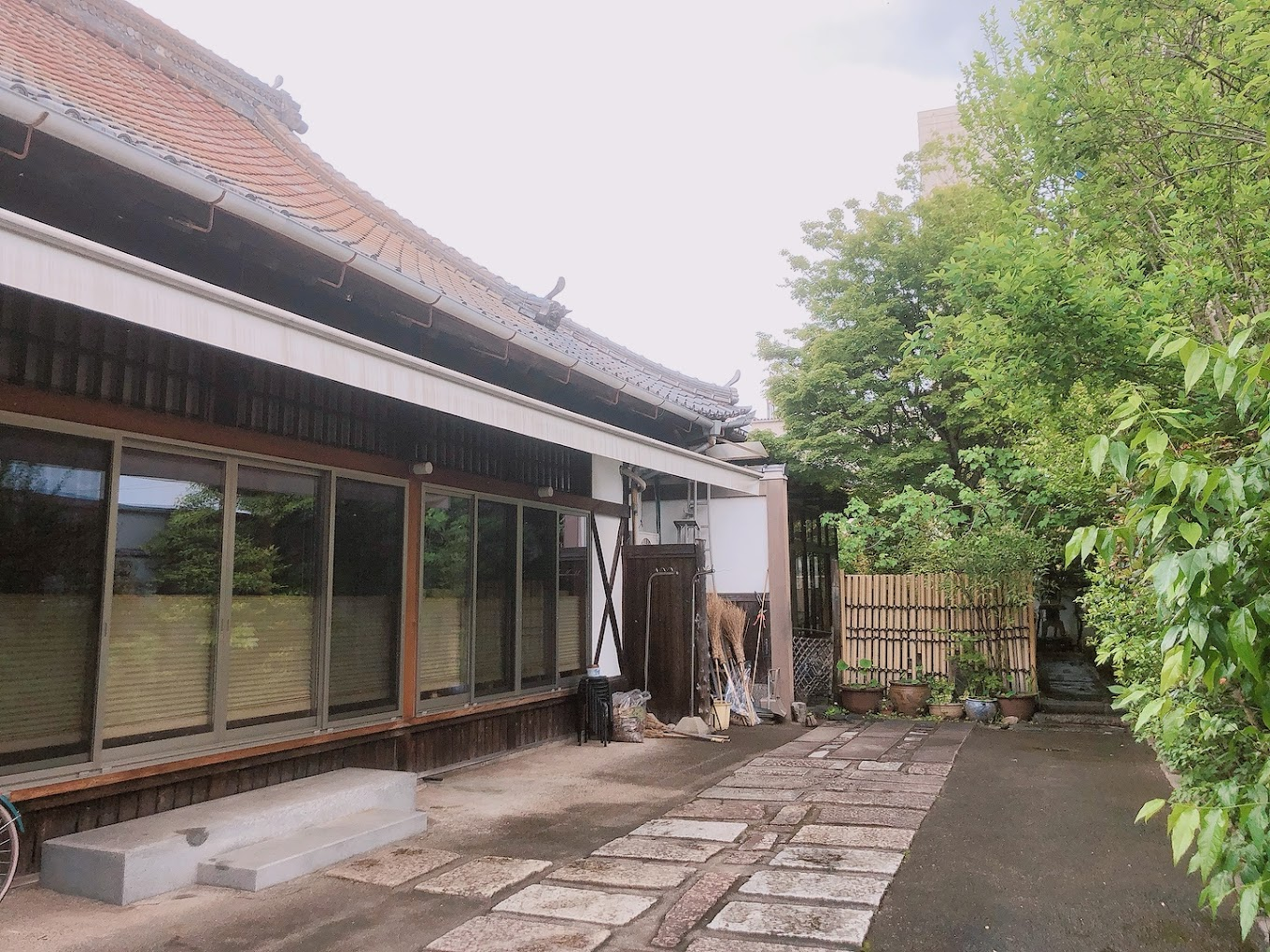
- Inryō-ji Temple (蔭凉寺)

Location
- Location: 10−28 Chūōchō
- Country: Japan
- Interactive map of Inryō-ji
- Coordinates: 34°39′24.5″N 133°55′24.4″E

Architecture
- Founder: Ikeda Tadakatsu
- Established: 1632
- Completed: 1998 (Reconstruction)

Inryō-ji (Japanese: 蔭凉寺) is a Buddhist temple in Okayama City, Okayama Prefecture, Japan. It is also known as Inryo-ji, Inryou-ji, or Inryoji. It is a temple of the Myōshin-ji school of the Rinzai sect in Japanese Zen. The temple was founded in 1632 during the Edo period by Ikeda Tadakatsu (the former feudal lord of Okayama who ruled Bizen Province and four districts of Bitchū Province and undertook maintenance of Okayama Castle and expansion of the castle town).

== History ==
Although the temple has been rebuilt over the centuries, the latest reconstruction occurred in 1998. The temple was completely burnt down in an air raid on Okayama in the early morning of June 29, 1945, but the stone pagoda and water bowl, though burnt and chipped, still remain, showing the intensity of World War II. It caught fire in August 1898 during the Meiji period and was the first known renovation.

== Gallery ==
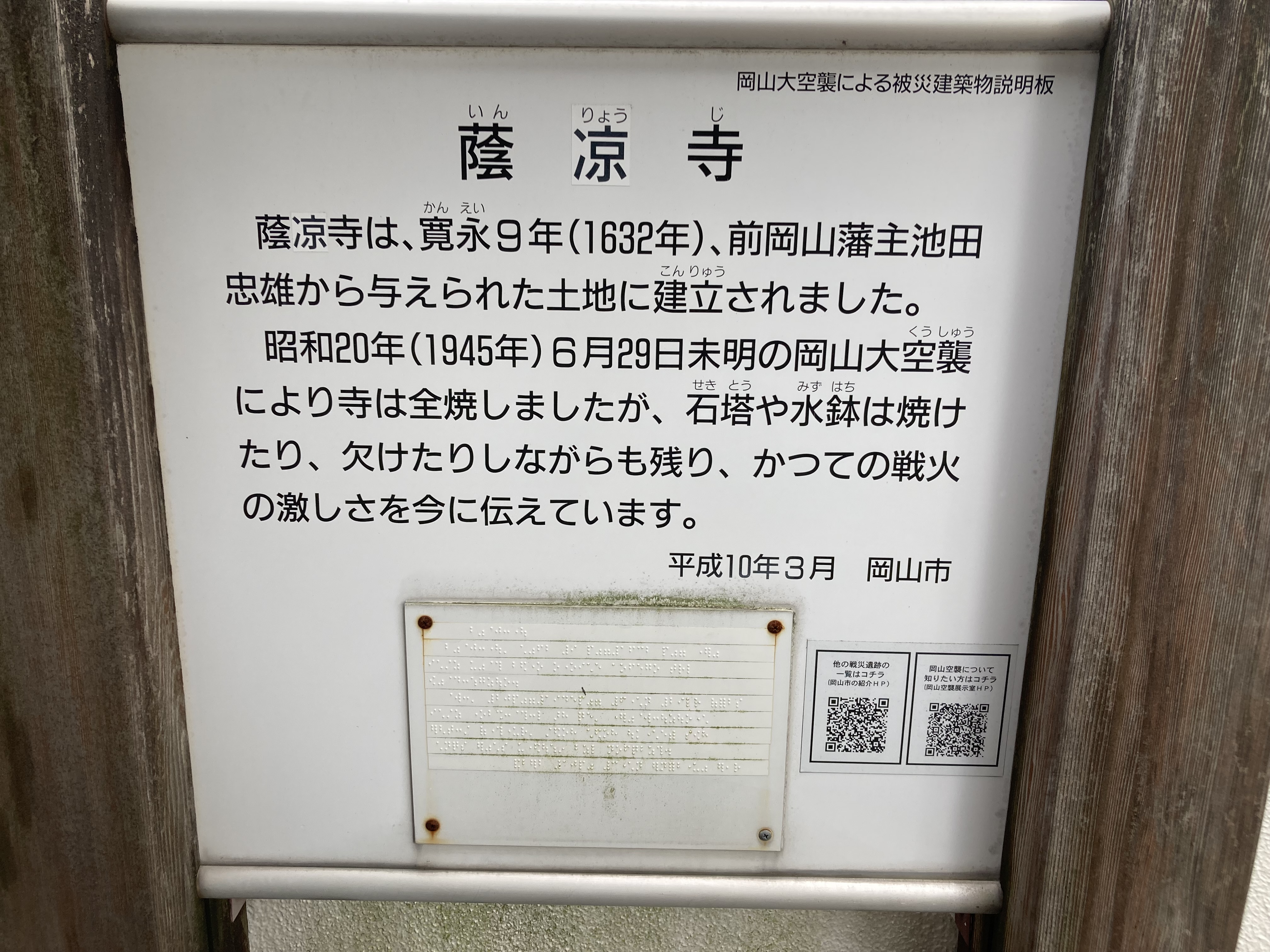
An explanation board of the damage due to the air raid was installed in March 1998 by Okayama City Hall.

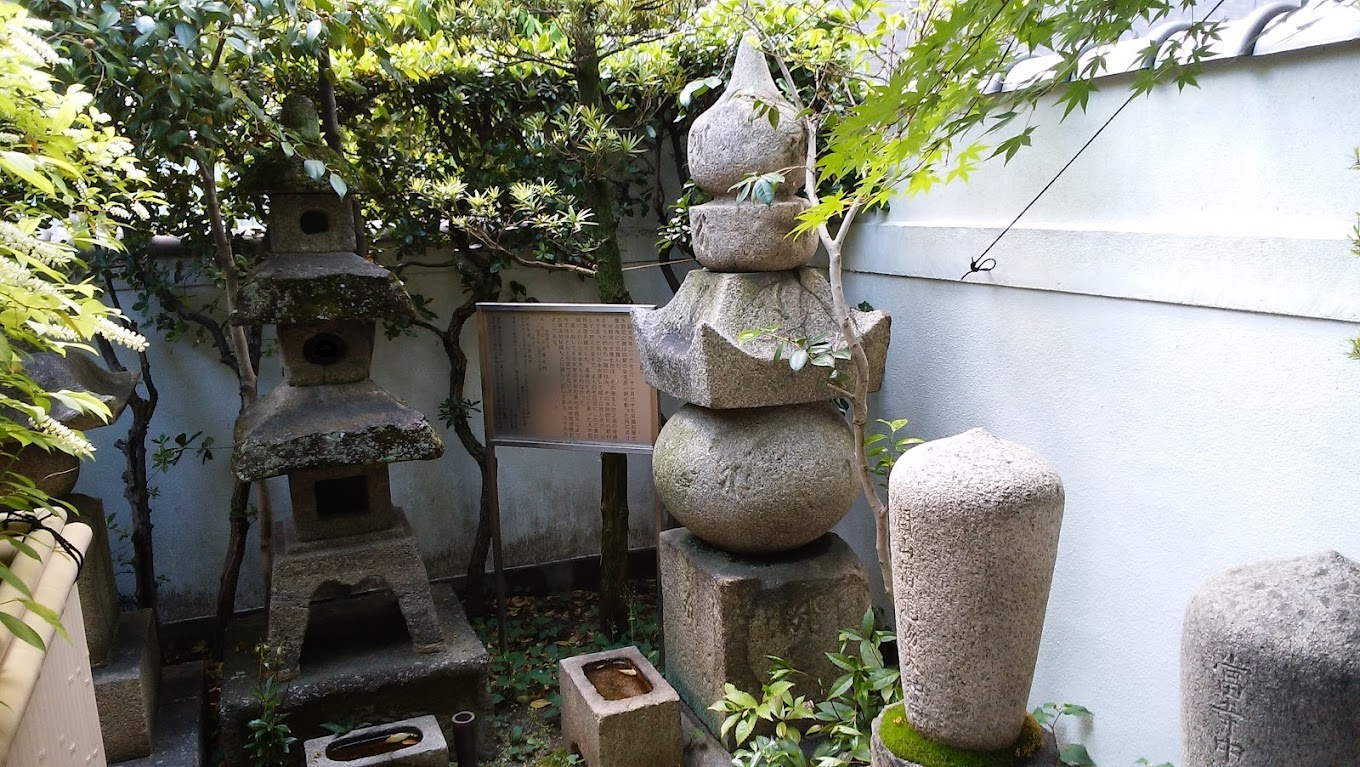
Stone pagoda and water bowl

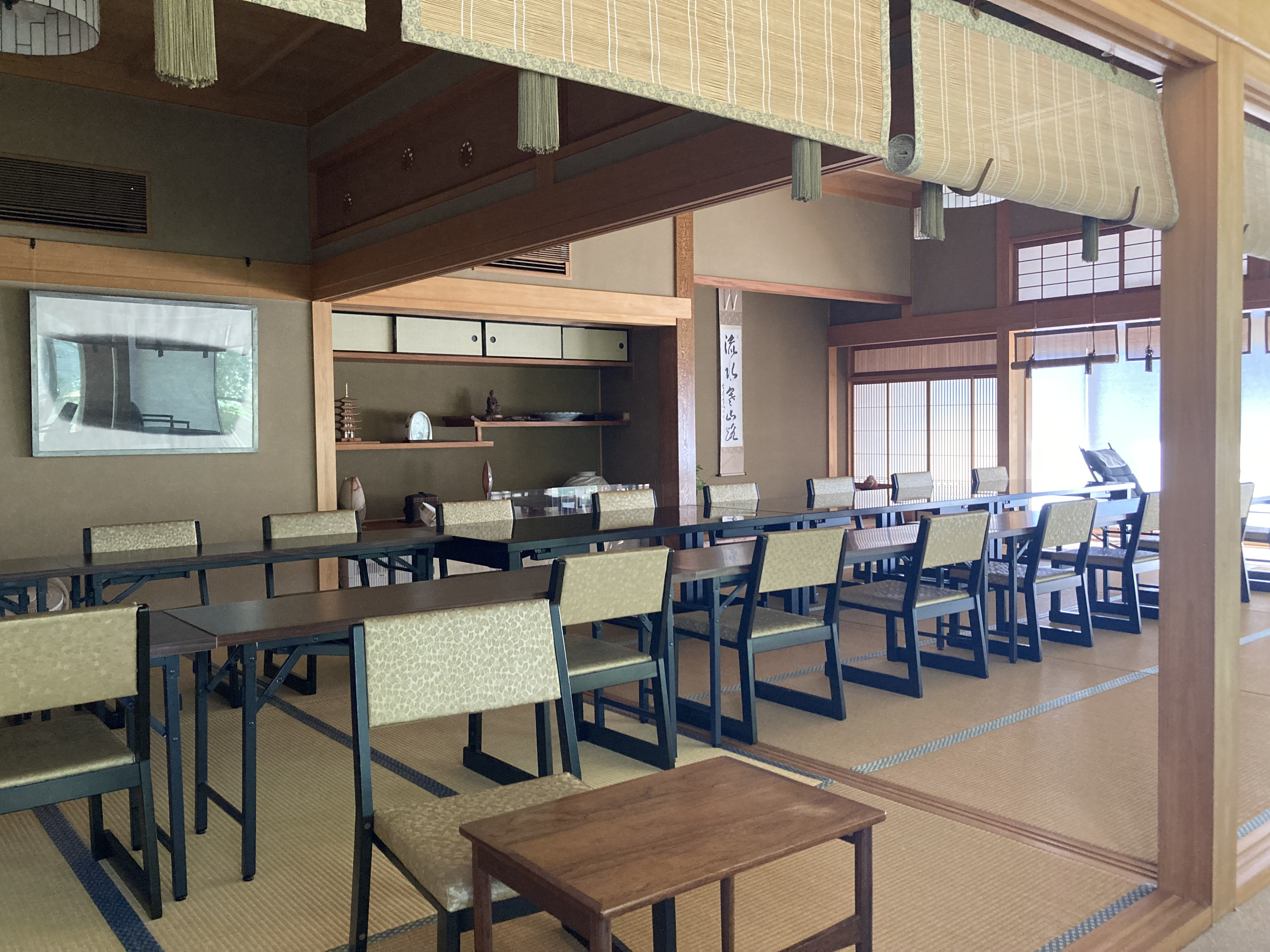
Tatami room

== Venue ==
The temple's uniqueness is its focus on the arts. The temple's tatami room has been used as a venue for musical performances and other artistic events during art summits, such as choral speaking, film screenings, and dance shows, since 1999. The temple's 15th-generation chief priest, Shinyu Shinohara, organizes the events and works as a live sound engineer.

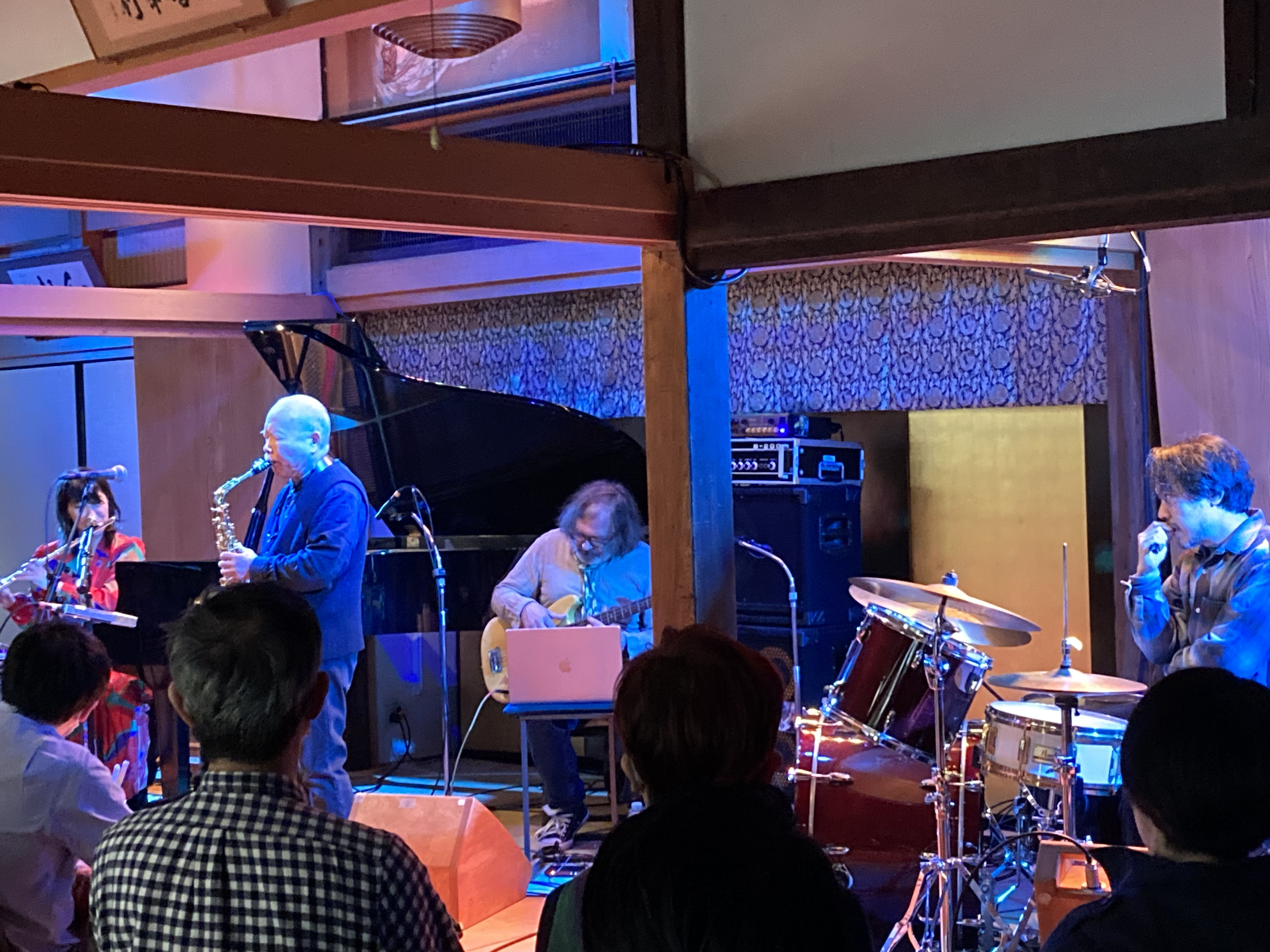
A live concert at Inryoji Temple

The venue has hosted acts all around the globe, including Jim O'Rourke, Ichiyo Izawa, Kirinji, Nicki Parrott, Yuko Ando, Ichiko Aoba, Peter Broderick, Laraaji, Reggie Washington, Akira Sakata, Simon Nabatov, Carol Welsman, Sylvain Chauveau, Kotringo, Brigid Mae Power, and Scott Hamilton. Some of these concerts were recorded by sound engineer Emre Ekici.
