= Matsuda clan =

Japanese family

Matsuda clan 松田氏
- Home province: Bizen
- Parent house: Hatano clan

The Matsuda clan (松田氏, Matsuda-shi) is a Japanese family tracing its origins to Bizen Province, and heirs of Fujiwara no Hidesato. Members of the Matsuda clan were military governors of Bizen during the Ashikaga Shogunate and retained significant power during the Sengoku period, but their influence was eliminated in the late 1500s as the result of campaigns by Ukita Naoie of the Ukita clan.
