= Kameyama Castle (Okayama) =

Castle in Okayama, Japan

- 亀山城
- Higashi-ku, Okayama Prefecture, Japan
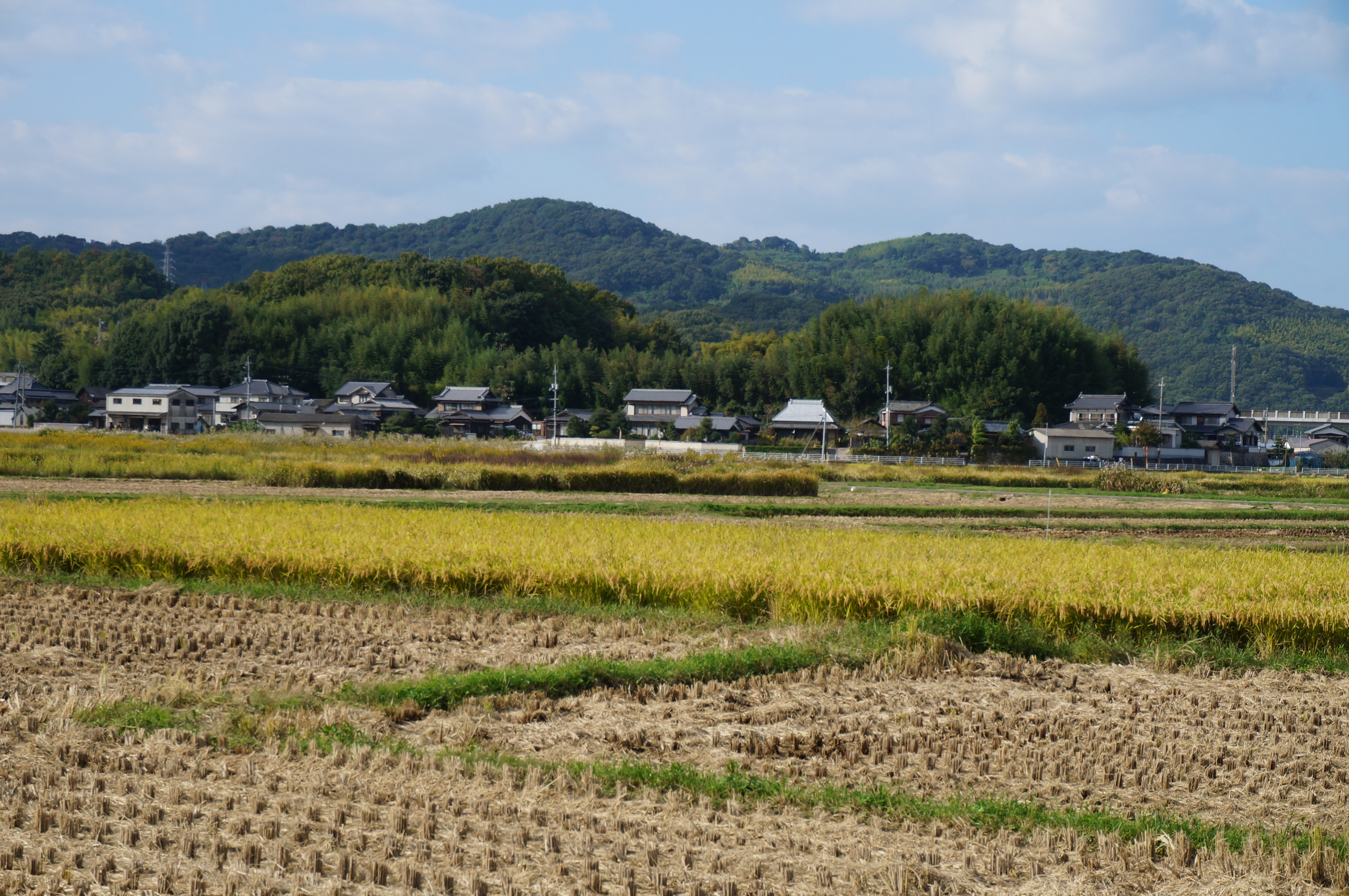
- Numa Castle / Kameyama Castle

Site information
- Type: Okajiro-style castle
- Owner: Nakayama clan, Ukita clan
- Condition: ruins

Location
- Coordinates: 34°42′24″N 134°2′11″E

Site history
- Built: 16c
- Built by: Nakayama Nobumasa
- Demolished: 1602

Garrison information
- Past commanders: Nakayama Nobumasa, Ukita Naoie

Kameyama Castle (沼城, Kameyama-jō), also well known as Numa Castle, is the remains of a castle structure in Higashi-ku, Okayama Prefecture, Japan. Its ruins have been protected as an Okayama City Designated Historic Site.

The castle was built by Nakayama Nobutada in the Tenbun period (1532–1555). In 1559, Ukita Naoie killed Nakayama Nobumasa by order of Uragami Munekage. Then Naoie moved Ukita clan's main bastion from Shinjōyama castle. Naoie expanded his territory based in the castle. In 1570, Naoie started remodeling Okayama castle and moved from the castle in 1573.

Soon after the Honnō-ji Incident, Hashiba Hideyoshi stopped and stayed in the castle on his way back to Kyoto to fight Akechi Mitsuhide's army.
