= Ukita Hideie =

Japanese Samurai and Daimyō of Bizen and Mimasaka Provinces (1572–1655)

- 宇喜多 秀家
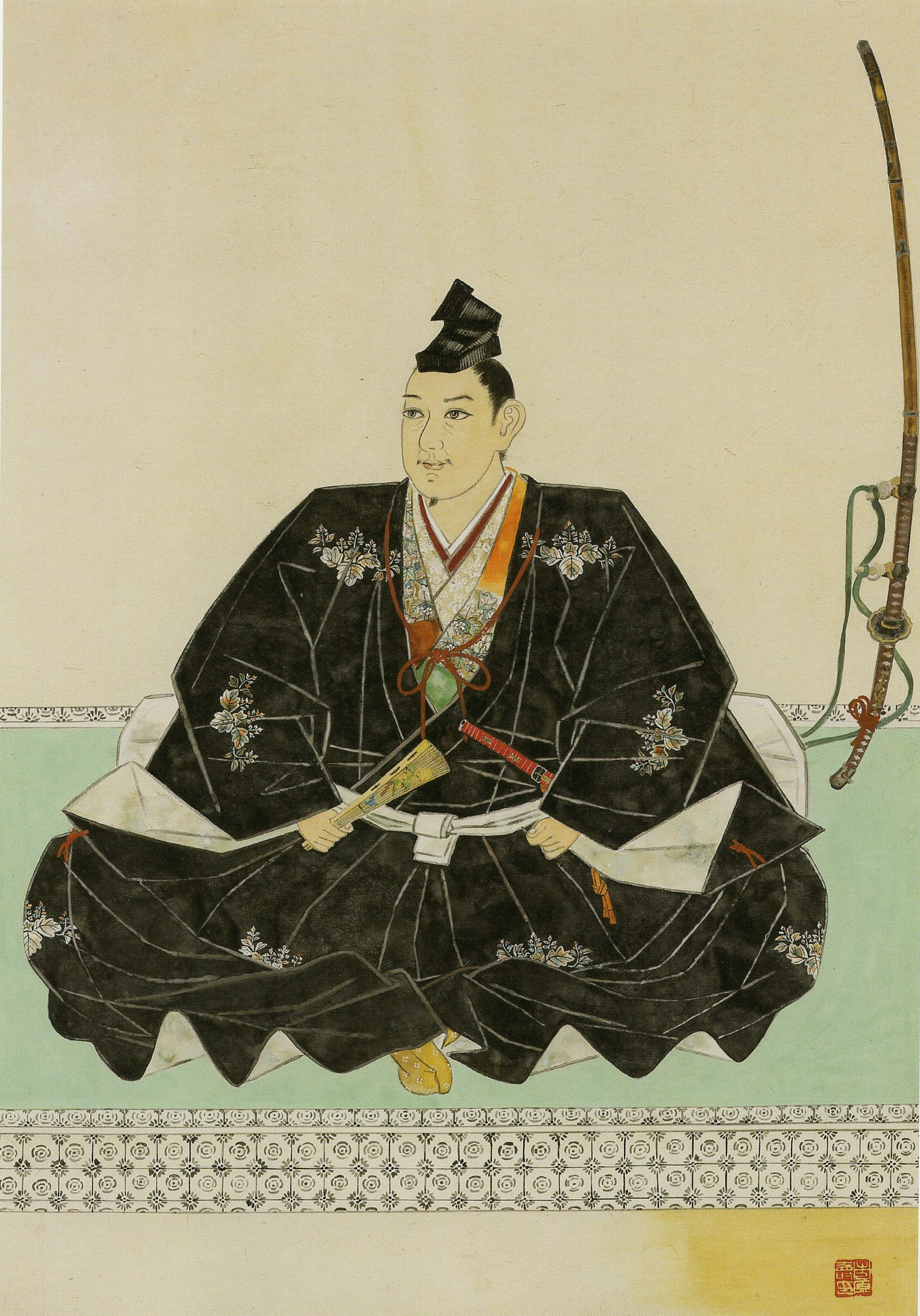

Head of Ukita clan
- In office 1582–1600
- Preceded by: Ukita Naoie
- Succeeded by: Ukita Hidetaka

Personal details
- Born: 1572 Bizen Province, Japan
- Died: 17 December 1655 (aged 82–83) Hachijōjima, Japan
- Spouse: Gōhime
- Children: Ukita Hideitaka; Ukita Hideetsugu; Yuki no Kata
- Parent: Ukita Naoie (father)
- Relatives: Maeda Toshiie (father-in-law); Toyotomi Hideyoshi (adopted father, father-in-law); Ukita Tadaie (uncle)

Military service
- Allegiance: Toyotomi clan Western Army
- Rank: Daimyo
- Unit: Ukita clan
- Commands: Okayama Castle
- Battles/wars: Invasion of Shikoku(1585); Kyushu Campaign (1587); Siege of Odawara (1590); Korean Campaign (1592-1598); Battle of Sekigahara (1600)

Ukita Hideie (宇喜多 秀家; 1572 – December 17, 1655) was a Japanese samurai and daimyō of Bizen and Mimasaka Provinces (modern Okayama Prefecture), and one of the council of Five Elders appointed by Toyotomi Hideyoshi. Son of Ukita Naoie, he married Gōhime, a daughter of Maeda Toshiie. Having fought against Tokugawa Ieyasu in the Battle of Sekigahara he was exiled to the island prison of Hachijō-jima, where he died.

== Early life ==
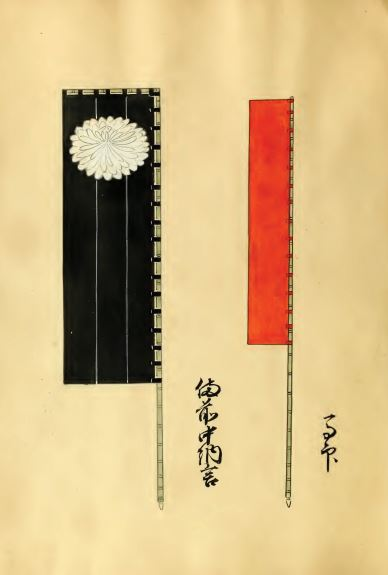
Ukita Hideie hata-jirushi, banner

Hideie's father Ukita Naoie was daimyō of Bizen province and initially opposed, but later sided with Oda Nobunaga and Toyotomi Hideyoshi. Naoie died in 1582, and Hideie became the head of the Ukita clan. As Hideie was still young (10 years old), it was Hideie's uncle (Ukita Tadaie) who acted as leader of the Ukita army until Hideie coming of age, in particular, Tadaie served on behalf of Hideie as a commander in numerous battles (under Toyotomi Hideyoshi). However, during the siege of Bitchū Takamatsu Castle in 1582, Nobunaga was assassinated on June 2 of that year, but the siege continued until the castle fell two days later. Hideyoshi raced back to Kyoto, leaving the Ukita clan in charge of Bizen, Mimasaka and newly taken parts of Bitchū Province. The Ukita were also to keep watch on Mōri Terumoto to the west.

In 1585, Hideie's forces under Ukita Tadaie led 23,000 men Toyotomi's forces in the Shikoku campaign against Chosokabe Motochika.

In 1586, Hideie was married to Hideyoshi's adopted daughter, Gōhime. (She had been adopted by Hideyoshi from Maeda Toshiie). Later, he participated in the Kyushu Conquest in 1587.

In 1590, Hideie joined Hideyoshi's military campaigns in the Odawara campaign against Hōjō Ujimasa.

Following the unification of Japan under Hideyoshi, in 1592, Hideyoshi appointed Hideie as field marshal for the First Korean campaigns, in which he commanded the "Reserves Division". In 1593, he was wounded in the failed siege of Haengju.

Later in 1597, Hideie became a "Chief Commander Army of the Left" in the Second Korean campaigns, returning in 1598 to serve as one of Hideyoshi's five counselors (Council of Five Elders) along with Maeda Toshiie, Uesugi Kagekatsu, Mōri Terumoto, and Tokugawa Ieyasu.

== Ukita clan unrest ==
In 1599, a disturbance occurred within the Ukita clan, as several vassals such as Togawa Tatsuyasu, Sadatsuna Oka, and others rebelled against Hideie.

The reason was Hideie's perceived favoritism towards Nakamura Jirobe, which further escalated into an armed rebellion which even Hideie could not resolve. The Togawa Family Genealogy, written later by the son of Togawa Tatsuyasu, who left the Ukita family at this time, provides a more detailed account. The Genealogy first cites the chaos within the domain caused by the comprehensive land survey carried out by Nakamura Jirobei, Osafune Kii-no-kami, and Ukita Tarozaemon. However, the Otoya no Shomon (Book of Otoya) argues that the conflict was caused by Nakamura's redistribution of fiefs in response to complaints from minor retainers who were discriminated against after senior retainers such as Tatsuyasu appropriated the lands near the castle for themselves. Another factor that made those vassals brazenly defy Jirobe was the perceived loss of Toyotomi government backing towards Hideie, and the death of Osafune Kii-no-kami, an Ukita senior vassal who was respected enough to prevent other dissatisfied Ukita clan vassals from defying their lord.

In January 1600, the conflict grew even more serious as Hideie's close aide, Nakamura Iemasa, was threatened by the rebellious Ukita clan vassals, causing Hideie to flee from Fushimi to Osaka. The rebels, led by Sakazaki Naomori, Togawa Tatsuyasu, Oka Echizen-no-kami, and Hanabusa Hidenari planned to attack Nakamura Jirobei, but the plan was discovered before it could be launched, and Nakamura successfully escaped. Enraged, Hideie summoned Togawa to Otani Yoshitsugu's residence and attempted to kill him, but Togawa was rescued by Sakyo-no-jo. Togawa then moved to Sakyo-no-jo's residence in Tamatsukuri, Osaka; there he, Oka, and Hanabusa shaved their heads and barricaded themselves inside.

In response, Sakakibara Yasumasa and Ōtani Yoshitsugu were appointed as inspectors to mediate this incident. As mediation lacked progress, Yoshitsugu finally decided to allow the rebellious senior vassals to leave the Ukita household. The Todai-ki records that Yoshitsugu believed the senior retainers were at fault, while Ieyasu believed Hideie was responsible. In the end, Yasumasa successfully settled the matter, and the armed riot was resolved without bloodshed.

However, this incident caused many of Hideie's retainers to defect from his clan. Approximately 70 samurai who served the Ukita clan left their service. Some retainers, such as Sakazaki Naomori, who was Hideie’s cousin, changed their allegiance to Tokugawa Ieyasu. These defections caused a massive military and political setback for the Ukita clan while strengthening the Tokugawa clan.

== Battle of Sekigahara ==
Ukita Hideie took part at the Battle of Sekigahara. In the field, his army fought against Fukushima Masanori. Hideie's forces began to wane and were steadily overcome by the forces of Fukushima Masanori due to the latter's superior troop quality. The disparity in combat effectiveness may have been attributable to the prior insurrection within the Ukita clan, which caused many senior samurai vassals of the Ukita to desert and join the Tokugawa faction. Hideie was thereby forced to enter Sekigahara with fresh recruits of rōnin mercenaries to fill the gap left within his army. This proved fatal over the course of long-term combat against the Fukushima clan's more disciplined and trained regular troops; the Ukita clan ranks began to break and finally collapse under pressure despite outnumbering the Fukushima.

== Exile ==
After the Battle of Sekigahara, the Ukita clan was stripped of its title by Ieyasu , but Hideie managed to escape capture. According to the Keicho Chu Bokusai-ki and Naniwa Tsune no Kyuki, Hideie fled with Shindo Masatsugu toward Mount Ibuki , was sheltered by a farmer for a while, and then had Naniwa Hidetsune and his retainers come from Kamigata to pick him up. He then hid in Kamigata, then fled to Satsuma Province , relying on Shimazu Yoshihiro, who was also on the Western Army.

One of the defectors, Kobayakawa Hideaki, was granted Okayama Castle and surrounding Ukita territories by the Tokugawa as a reward for his betrayal, which is believed to have been the decisive factor in the Tokugawa victory. Hideie was angered by the betrayal and initially intended to hunt down Kobayakawa for a man-to-man duel but was stopped by his advisors. After escaping the battle, he went into hiding in Satsuma Province where his former allies protected him for several years.

However, in December 1602, a peace agreement was concluded between the Tokugawa and Shimazu clans, and Shimazu Tadatsune went to Kyoto to meet Ieyasu. At this time, Tadatsune revealed Hideie's hiding place, and his extradition was initiated.

On August 20, Tadatsune sent a letter to Nishisho Shodai of Shokoku-ji Temple requesting Hideie's life, and in the same letter, he also mentioned that he had requested Honda Masazumi and Yamaguchi Naotomo to spare Hideie's life.

Hideie was then confined in Mt. Kuno in Suruga Province instead. Later, he was forced to appear before Tokugawa himself where he was sentenced to exile on the island of Hachijō-jima, along with several supporters, including his two sons. Gohime, (Hideie's wife) sought refuge with the Maeda clan and was able to correspond and send gifts (rice, sake, clothing) to her husband and sons from there.

On August 6, 1603, Hideie left Satsuma for Fushimi.

Hideie passed away on November 20, 1655 (the first year of the Meireki era).

== Family ==
- Wife: Gohime
- Children: Ukita Hideitaka, Ukita Hideetsugu, Yuki no Kata (married Yamazaki Nagatomo and Tomita Nobutaka)

== Notes ==
Preceded by Ukita Naoie	Ukita family head 1582–1600	Succeeded by Ukita Hidetaka
