= Ukita clan =

Japanese samurai clan

Ukita 宇喜多氏
- The emblem (mon) of the Ukita clan
- Home province: Bizen Province
- Final ruler: Ukita Hideie
- Ruled until: 1600

The Ukita clan (宇喜多氏, Ukita-shi) was a Japanese samurai clan of daimyo. The Ukita clan ruled Bizen Province and Bingo Province during the late Sengoku period.

== History ==
The Ukita were a local samurai clan in Bizen that became powerful daimyo when Ukita Naoie was head of the clan. Ukita Hideie became one of Toyotomi Hideyoshi's five great senior retainers called Gotairō (Council of Five Elders), which took stewardship over Hideyoshi's infant son Hideyori upon Hideyoshi's death in 1598. After friction between Hideyoshi's retainers Ishida Mitsunari and Tokugawa Ieyasu led to the Battle of Sekigahara, Hideie sided with Mitsunari as part of the Western Army. After the Western Army's defeat, the Tokugawa clan abolished the Ukita clan and Hideie was sentenced to exile on Hachijō-jima.

== Clan heads ==
1. Ukita Muneie
2. Ukita Hisaie
3. Ukita Yoshiie
4. Ukita Okiie
5. Ukita Naoie
6. Ukita Hideie

== Notable retainers ==
- Ukita Haruie
- Ukita Tadaie: Naoie's younger brother.
- Togawa Hideyasu : He was a senior retainer of Naoie. His mother was a wet nurse of Naoie's younger brother Ukita Tadaie.
- Togawa Michiyasu : Togawa Hideyasu's son. He founded Niwase Domain after the Battle of Sekigahara
- Osafune Sadachika
- Oka Ietoshi
- Hanabusa Masayuki : He was a senior retainer.
- Hanbusa Masanari : Hanabusa Masayuki's son.
- Akashi Yukikatsu
- Akashi Takenori : His wife was Ukita Hideie's sister.
