= Okayama Castle =

Castle in Okayama, Japan

Coordinates: 34°39′55″N 133°56′10″E

Okayama Castle 岡山城
- Okayama, Okayama Prefecture, Japan
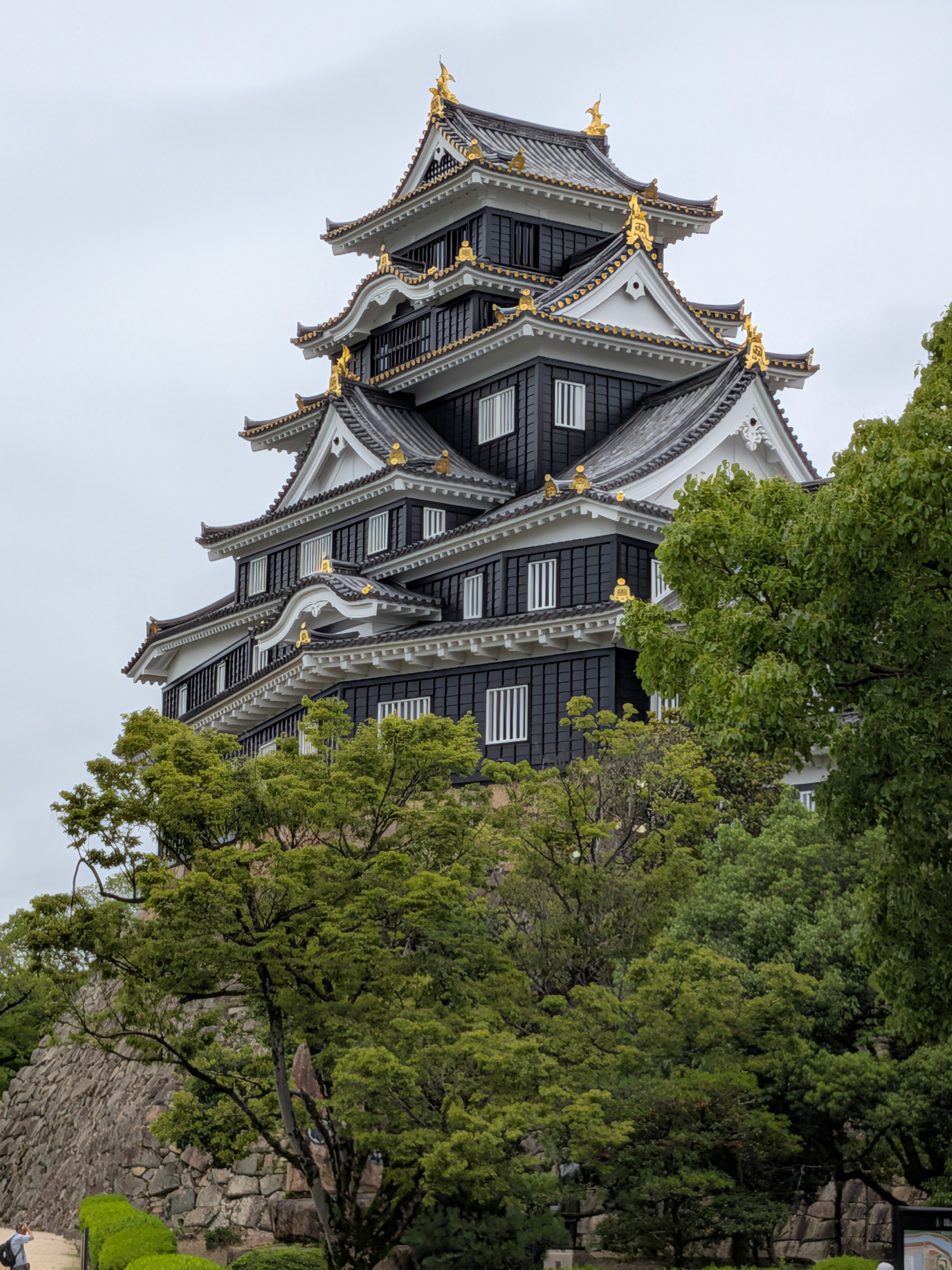

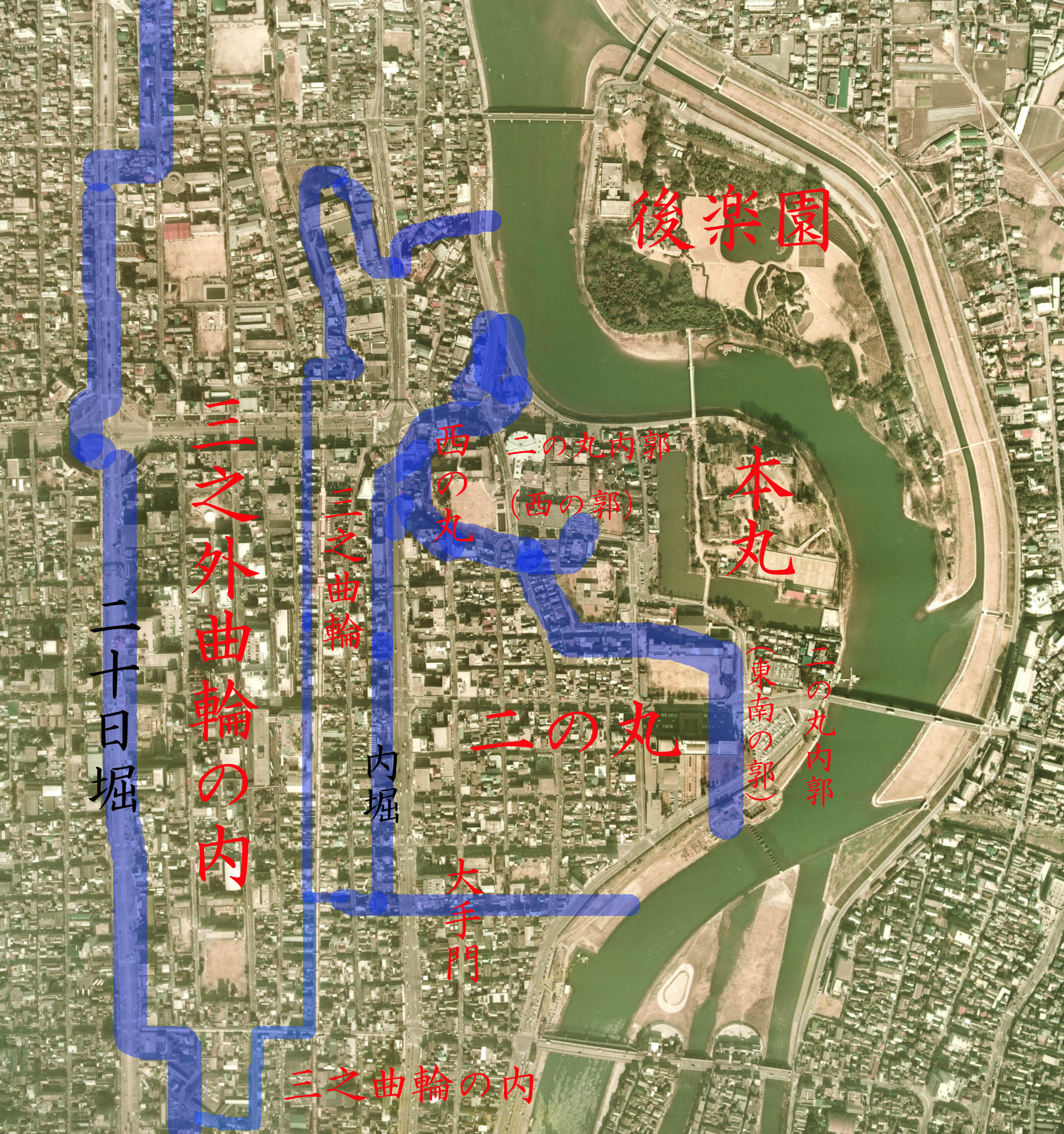
- An aerial view of Okayama Castle

Site information
- Type: Azuchi-Momoyama castle
- Controlled by: Nawa clan (1346-unknown); Kanamitu clan (1521-1528); Ukita clan (1570-1600); Kobayakawa clan (1600-1602); Ikeda clan (1602-1869); Japan (1869-present)
- Condition: Surviving turrets and stone walls, concrete replica keep (1966)

Site history
- Built: 1346-1369 (Nawa clan) rebuilt 1590-1597 (Ukita Hideie) replica donjon completed 1966
- In use: 1346-1889
- Materials: Wood, stone, plaster, tile.
- Demolished: Moats: Ministry of War (1873-82), Main tower: US air raid (Jun 29, 1945)
- Battles/wars: Contributed to Sekigahara (total loss)

Okayama Castle (岡山城, Okayama-jō) is a Japanese castle in the city of Okayama in Okayama Prefecture in Japan. The main tower was completed in 1597, destroyed in 1945 and replicated in concrete in 1966. Two of the watch towers survived the bombing of 1945 and are now listed by the national Agency for Cultural Affairs as Important Cultural Properties.

In stark contrast to the white "Egret Castle" of neighboring Himeji, Okayama Castle has a black exterior, earning it the nickname Crow Castle (烏城, U-jō) or "castle of the black bird". (The black castle of Matsumoto in Nagano is also known as "Crow Castle", but it is karasu-jō in Japanese.)

Today, only a few parts of Okayama Castle's roof (including the fish-shaped-gargoyles) are gilded, but prior to the Battle of Sekigahara the main keep also featured gilded roof tiles, earning it the nickname Golden Crow Castle (金烏城, Kin U-jō).

== History ==
In 1570, Ukita Naoie killed castle lord Kanemitsu Munetaka and started remodeling the castle and completed by his son Hideie in 1597. Three years later, Hideie sided with the ill-fated Toyotomi Clan at the Battle of Sekigahara, was captured by the Tokugawa Clan and exiled to the island prison of Hachijo. The castle and surrounding fiefdoms were given to Kobayakawa Hideaki as spoils of war. Kobayakawa died just two years later without leaving an heir, and the castle (and fiefdom) was given to the Ikeda Clan, who later added Kōraku-en as a private garden.

In 1869 the castle became the property of the Meiji government's Hyōbu-shō (Ministry of War), who saw the 'samurai' era castles as archaic and unnecessary. Like many other castles throughout Japan, the outer moats were filled in, most castle buildings were dismantled and the old castle walls gradually disappeared underneath the city. On June 29, 1945, allied bombers burnt the main keep, and an adjacent gate, to the ground, leaving only two turrets and some of the stone walls remaining. Reconstruction work on the keep and gate began in 1964 and was completed in 1966. In 1996 the rooftop gargoyles were gilded as part of the 400th anniversary celebrations.

The reconstructed main keep is a concrete building complete with air-conditioning, elevators and numerous displays documenting the castle's history (with a heavy focus on the Ikeda era.) Little information is available in English. Access to the inner sanctuary is free.

== Gallery ==
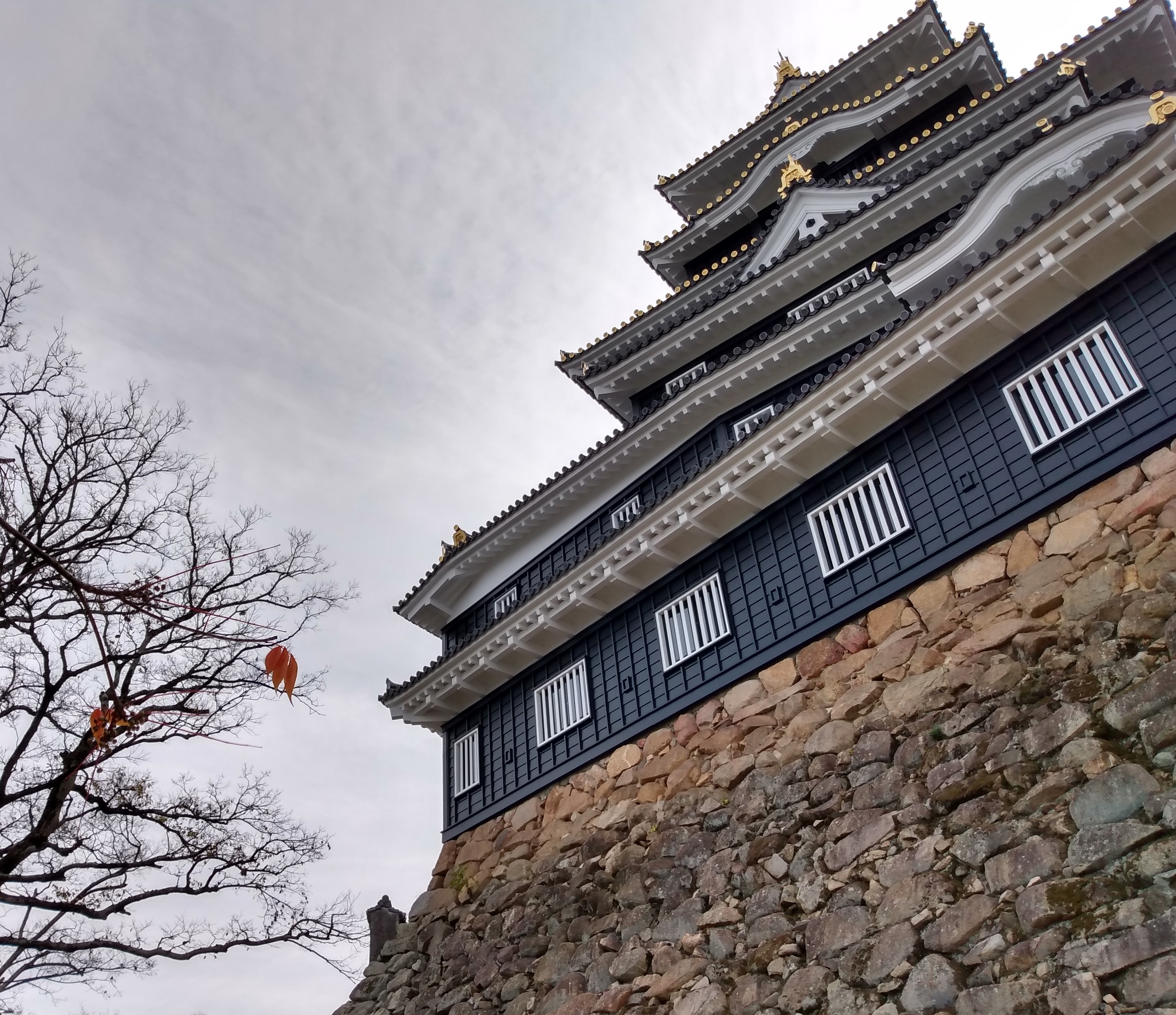
Okayama castle with last cherry leaves of autumn

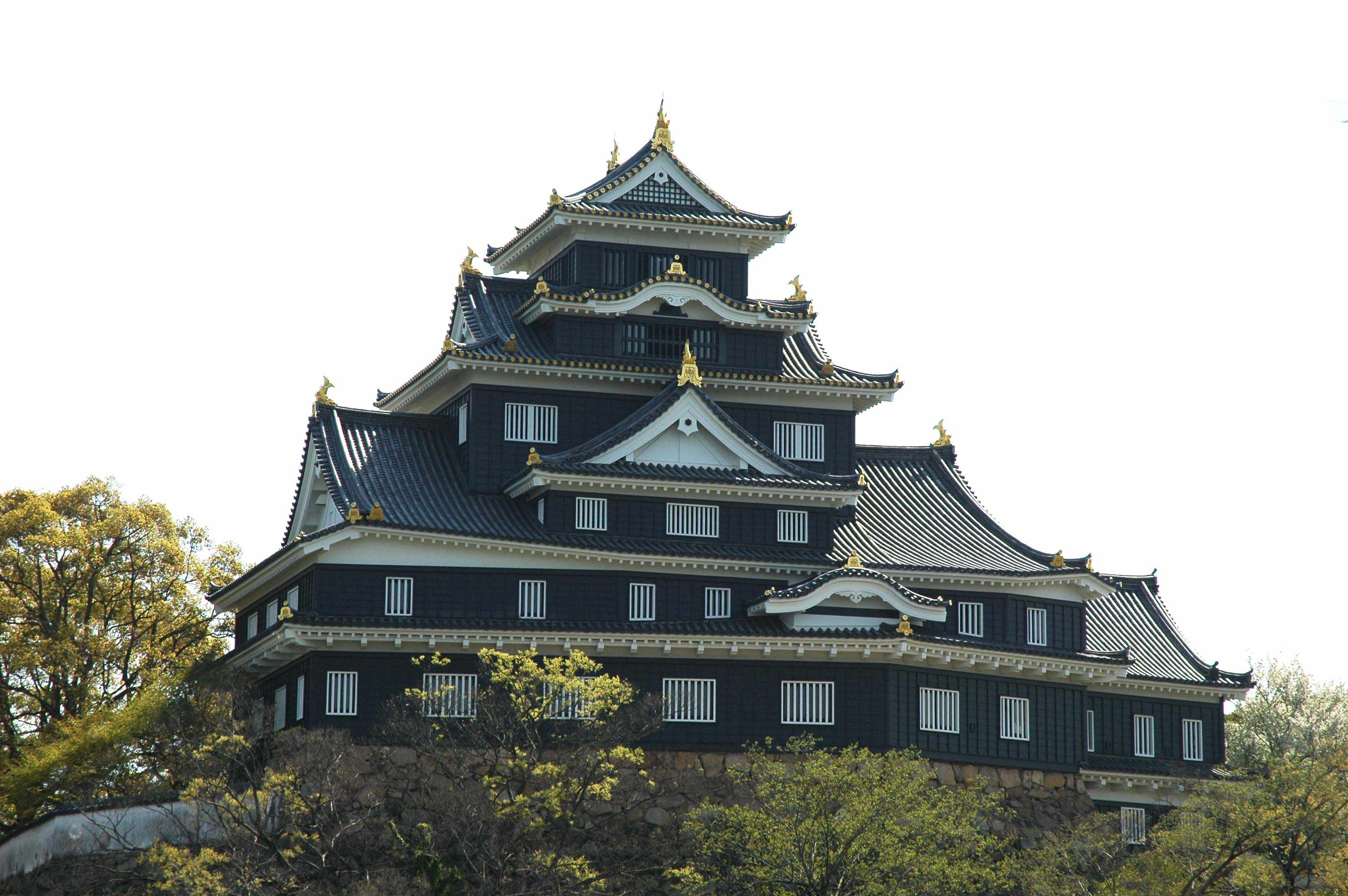
The main facade of Okayama Castle

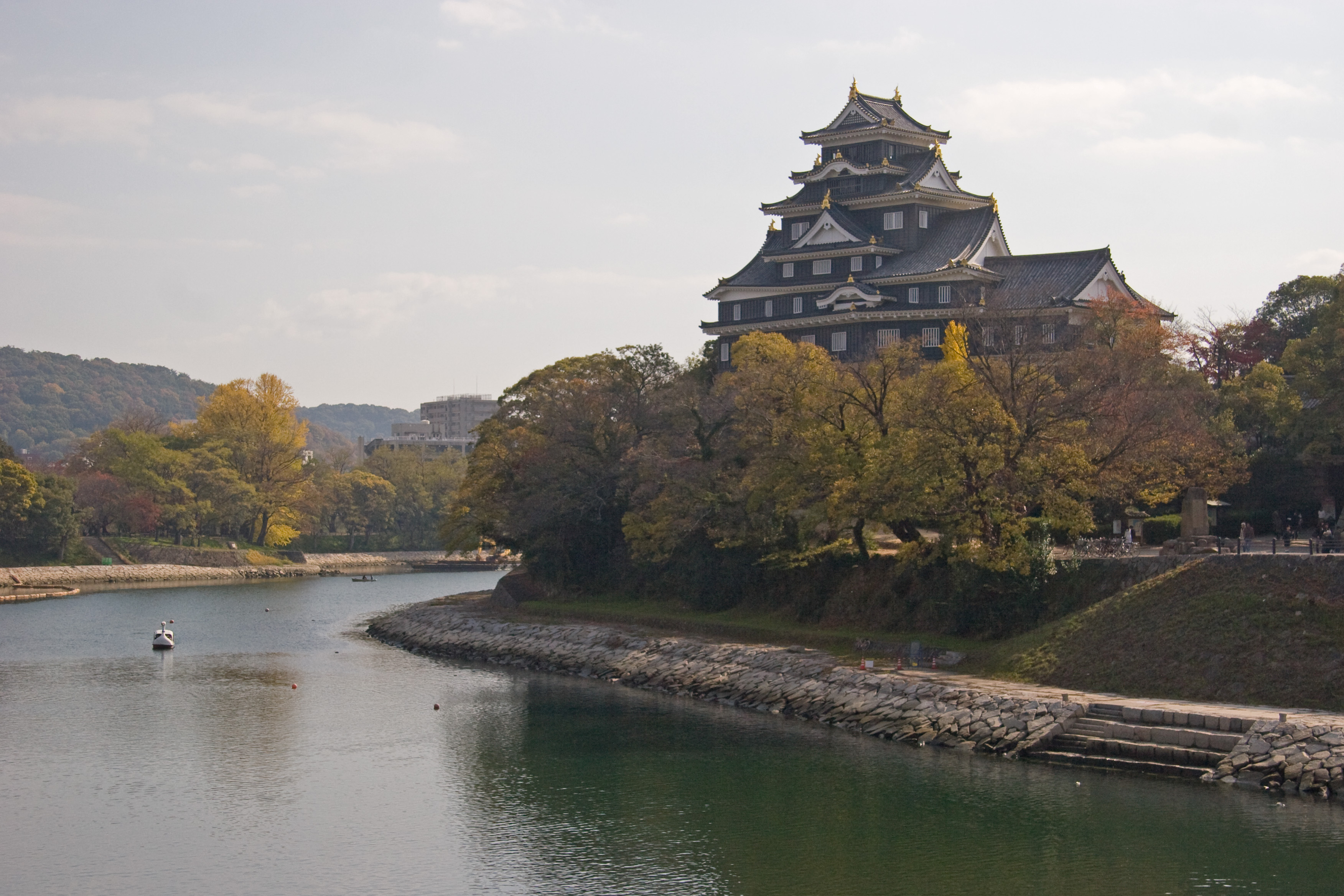
Okayama castle

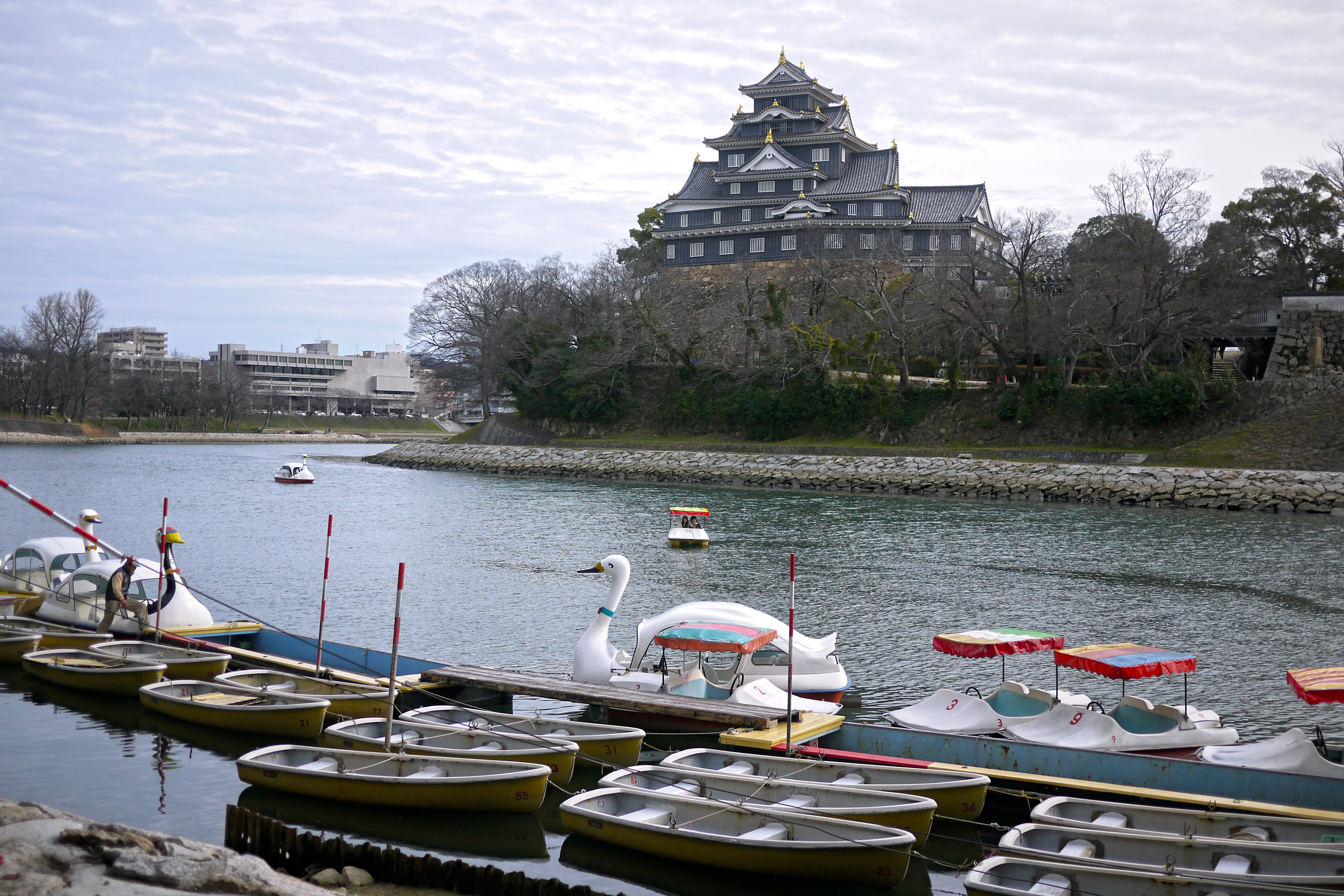
Okayama castle and the Asahi river

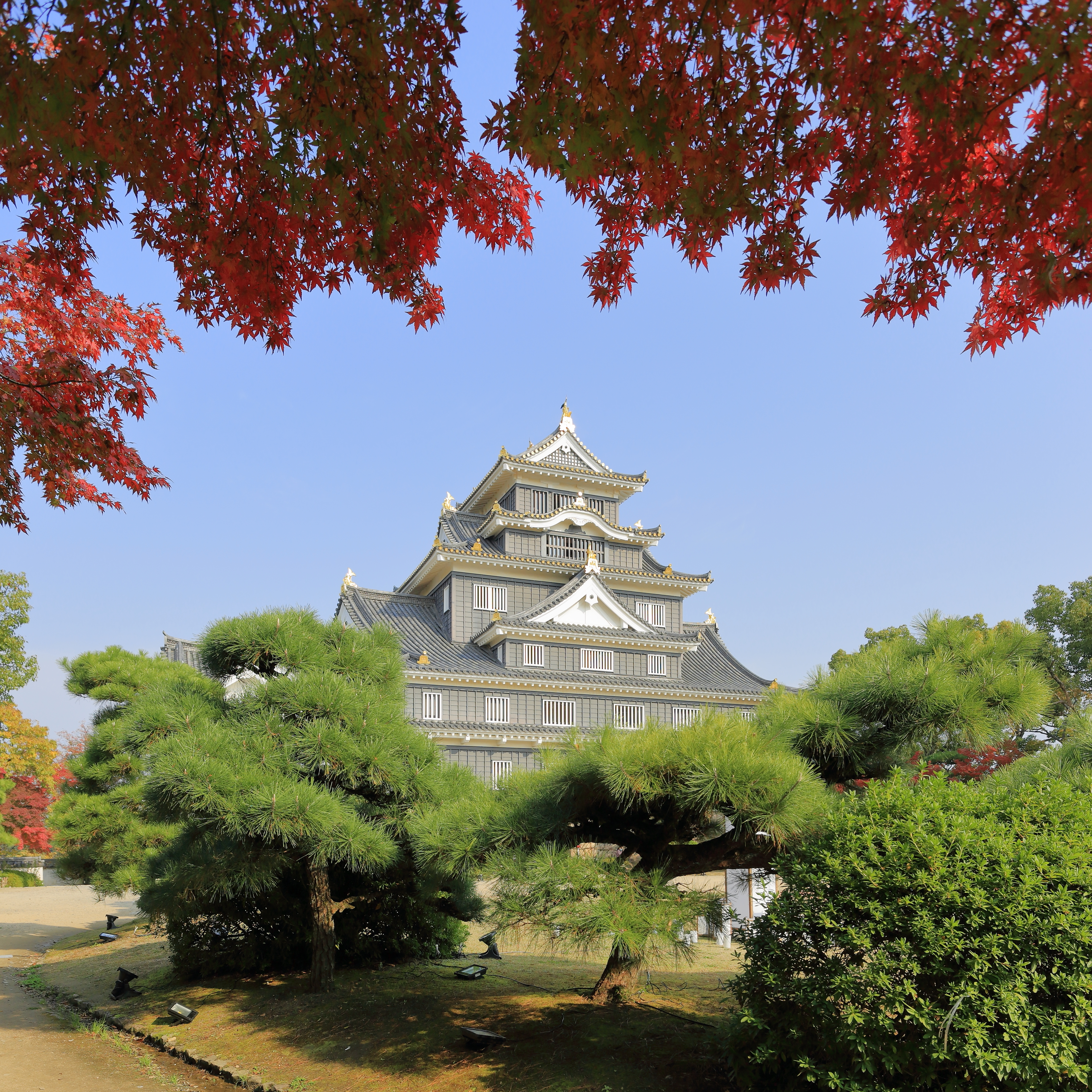
Okayama Castle (November 2016)

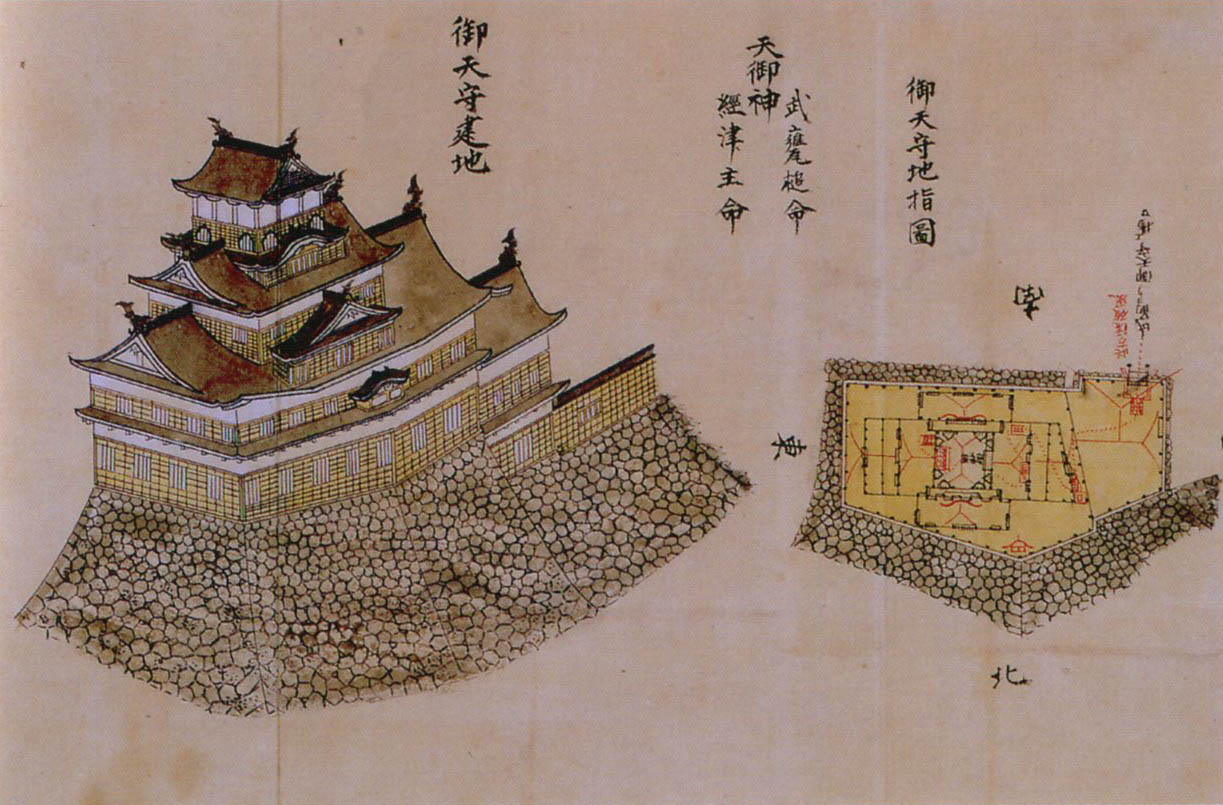
Okayama castle in a historic painting

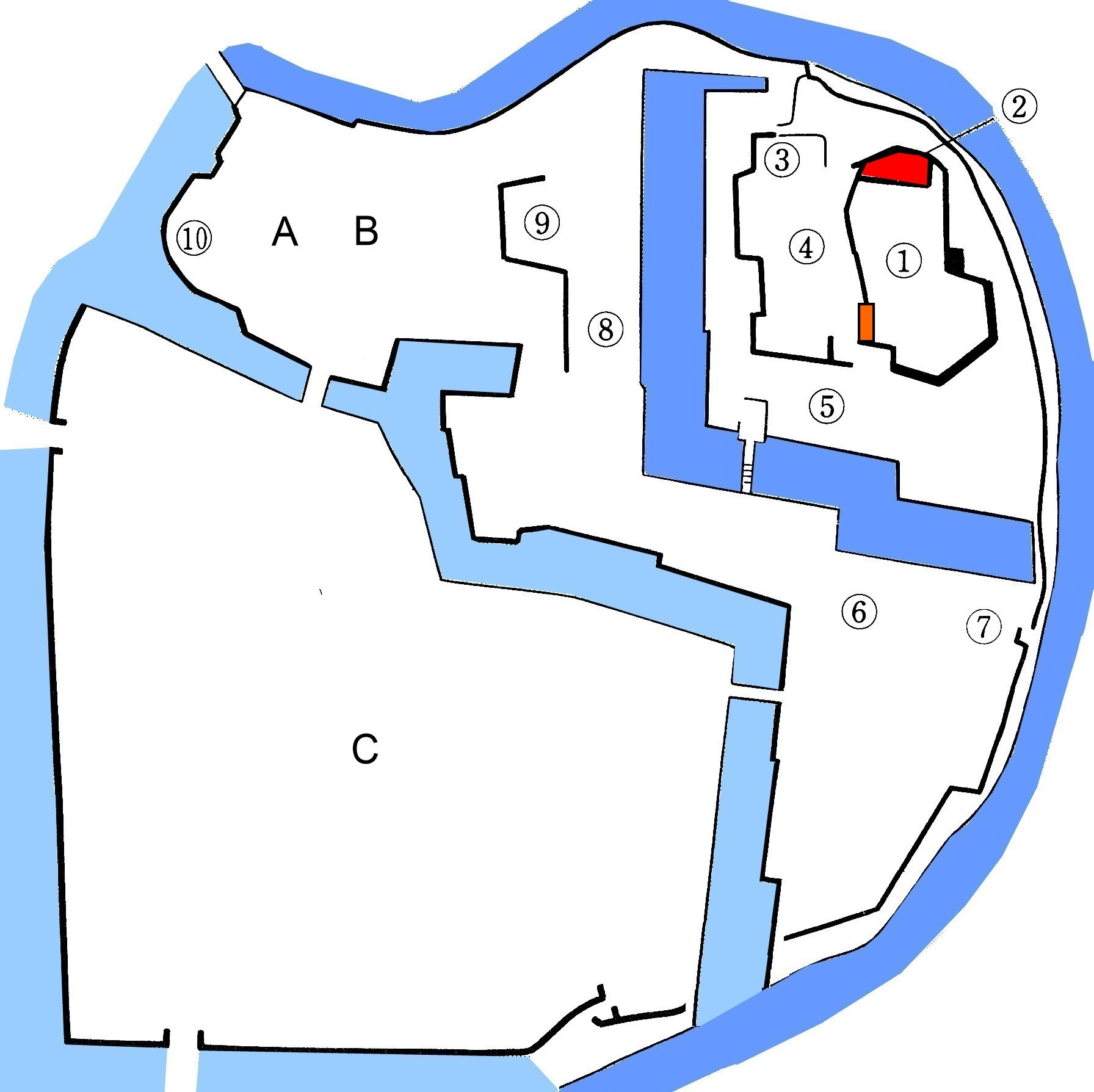
Okayama castle plan

== See also ==
- Okayama Kōraku Gardens
- Inryoji Temple
