= Ukita Naoie =

Japanese daimyō (1529–1582)

- 宇喜多 直家
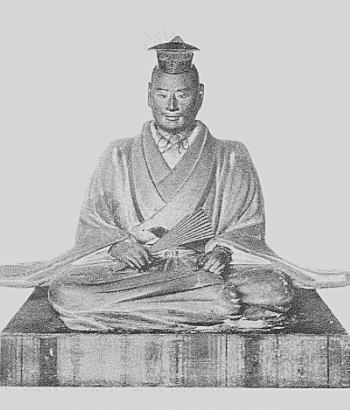

Head of Ukita clan
- In office 1536–1582
- Preceded by: Ukita Okiie
- Succeeded by: Ukita Hideie

Personal details
- Born: 1529 Bizen Province, Japan
- Died: February 1, 1582 (aged 52–53) Okayama Castle, Bizen Province, Japan
- Children: Ukita Hideie
- Parent: Ukita Okiie (father)
- Relatives: Ukita Tadaie (brother)

Military service
- Allegiance: Ukita clan Uragami clan Oda clan
- Commands: Kameyama Castle
- Battles/wars: Battle of Myōzenji (1567); Siege of Tatsuno (1569); Siege of Tenjinyama (1574); Mimasaka Campaign (1581); Bizen Campaign (1581)

Ukita Naoie (宇喜多 直家; 1529 – February 1, 1582) was a Japanese daimyō of the Sengoku period. He was born in Bizen Province, to Ukita Okiie, a local samurai leader and head of the Ukita clan.

He has historical reputation as one of Japan's Three Great Villains (日本三大梟雄), a nickname which he shared with Matsunaga Hisahide and Saitō Dōsan, due to their ambitious and treasonous personality, along with the habit of resorting to underhanded tactics and assassinations to eliminate their opposition. (Note: Not to be confused with Ashikaga Takauji, Dōkyō and Taira no Kiyomori; who also known with similar sobriquet as Japan's Three Great Villains by Confucian-minded history scholars due to their lack of loyalty to the throne.)

== Biography ==
Naoie's grandfather Yoshiie was killed by Shimamura clan in 1534, Naoie narrowly escaped from Toishi castle along with his father Ukita Okiie. Two years later after his father died, he become head of Ukita clan at the age of seven years old.

In 1543, he became a vassal of Uragami Munekage and made remarkable progress in his war service.

In 1544, Naoie was appointed as the lord of a small castle called Otogo Castle. A year later, he was given command of 30 ashigaru to defend the fort and was rewarded for fighting treacherous Munekage's enemies.

In 1551, under the orders of Urakami Munekage, Naoie married the daughter of Katsumasa, the governor of Nakayama-Bichu. The Nakayama clan was a local feudal lord based in Numa Castle (Higashi Ward, Okayama City).However, the Uragami clan tried to subjugate the Nakayama clan. It is said that the reason for this was that the Nakayama clan had neglected Uragami Munekage. The Uragami clan decided to subjugate the Nakayama clan because they suspected that Nakayama Bitchu no Kami and Morizane Shimamura (Nanami) were plotting a rebellion. At this time, Ukita Naoie took out a letter that served as evidence of Shimamura Bungo-no-kami's plot, and said that Bungo-no-kami was the enemy of his grandfather (Ukita Yoshiie), and that he would kill him immediately if ordered to do so. It is also said that Nakayama Bitchu-no-kami was his (Naoie's) father-in-law, but that he would kill him for the sake of his lord (Uragami Munekage). Naoie built a teahouse next to Numa Castle, invited Nakayama Bitchu-no-kami there, and killed him. Meanwhile, Shimamura rushed to attack Numa Castle, but was killed by the Ukita clan forces in battle on the castle gate. After that, Naoie was given Numa Castle and most of the territories of the Nakayama and Shimamura clans. Following this, many of Munekage's vassals deserted and joined the Ukita clan.

In 1559, he killed his father-in-law Nakayama Nobumasa by order of Uragami Munekage and restored their old territory.

In 1567, at the Battle of Myōzenji, Naoie succeeded in expelling almost all forces from Bitchū who had entered the western portion of Bizen.

In 1569, Naoie joined with Oda Nobunaga and Akamatsu Masahide of western Harima Province to rebel against his lord, Uragami Munekage. However, Munekage attacking Masahide at Tatsuno Castle and force Masahide to surrender. Munekage, whereupon give Naoie a special exception to return to serve him.

In 1570, Naoie killed Okayama castle lord Kanemitsu Munetaka and started remodeling the castle and moved Ukita clan's main bastion from Numa castle in 1573.

In March 1574, Naoie broke off relations with Uragami Munekage. The battle went against Munekage, and in October of the following year, Munekage's castle, Tenjinyama Castle, fell.

In 1574, since the influence of Naoie was increasing, Uragami Munekage attempted to oust Naoie. Naoie was dissatisfied with the Munekage decision, he allied with Mōri clan and launched a rebellion against Munekage. Naoie attacked Tenjinyama castle successfully, effectively ending Uragami Munekage's rule.

In 1579, the Ukita clan resisted an advance by Hashiba Hideyoshi, who led a westward march upon orders of Oda Nobunaga. Sensing Oda Nobunaga's victory over the Mori clan, Naoie sent a force to help the Mori, but not present citing personal illness as an excuse.

Later in 1581, Naoie cut ties with the Mōri clan and submitted to Nobunaga. Thereafter, he engaged in battles across Mimasaka and Bizen against the Mōri.

== Beliefs ==
He was a man of deep faith. When the Matsuda clan—lords of Kanagawa Castle—pressured major temples and shrines within their domain to convert to the Nichiren sect (which the Matsuda themselves followed), he refused to comply and consequently saw his own temple burned down; however, he later provided financial support for the reconstruction of the destroyed halls and structures at Kanayama-ji Temple and Kibitsuhiko Shrine. As a result, these religious institutions hold him in high regard.

After establishing Okayama Castle as his base, he invited merchants to the area and worked to develop the castle town. Previously, the commercial hubs of Bizen Province had been concentrated in the east—in places like Saidaiji and Bizen-Fukuoka—but the development of the castle town under the successive leadership of Naoie and his son Hideie led to the growth of an urban center with Okayama Castle at its heart.

== Death ==
In February 1582, he died in Okayama Castle. But his strategic maneuver proved effective. Nobunaga confirmed his heir, Ukita Hideie, to inherit his domain. Later, Toyotomi Hideyoshi adopted Hideie.

== Notes ==
Preceded by Ukita Okiie	Ukita family head 1536–1582	Succeeded by Ukita Hideie
