= Bizen Province =

Former province of Japan

Map of Japanese provinces (1868) with Bizen highlighted

Bizen Province (備前国, Bizen no Kuni; Japanese pronunciation: [bʲí.(d͡)zè̞ɴ̀, -(d͡)zè̞ǹ nò̞ kɯ̈̀.ɲ̟ì]) was a province of Japan in the area that is eastern Okayama Prefecture in the Chūgoku region of western Japan. Bizen bordered Bitchū, Mimasaka, and Harima Provinces. Its abbreviated form name was Bishū (備州). In terms of the Gokishichidō system, Bizen was one of the provinces of the San'yō circuit. Under the Engishiki classification system, Bizen was ranked as one of the 35 "superior countries" (上国) in terms of importance, and one of the "near countries" (近国) in terms of distance from the capital. The provincial capital was located in what is now the city of Okayama.

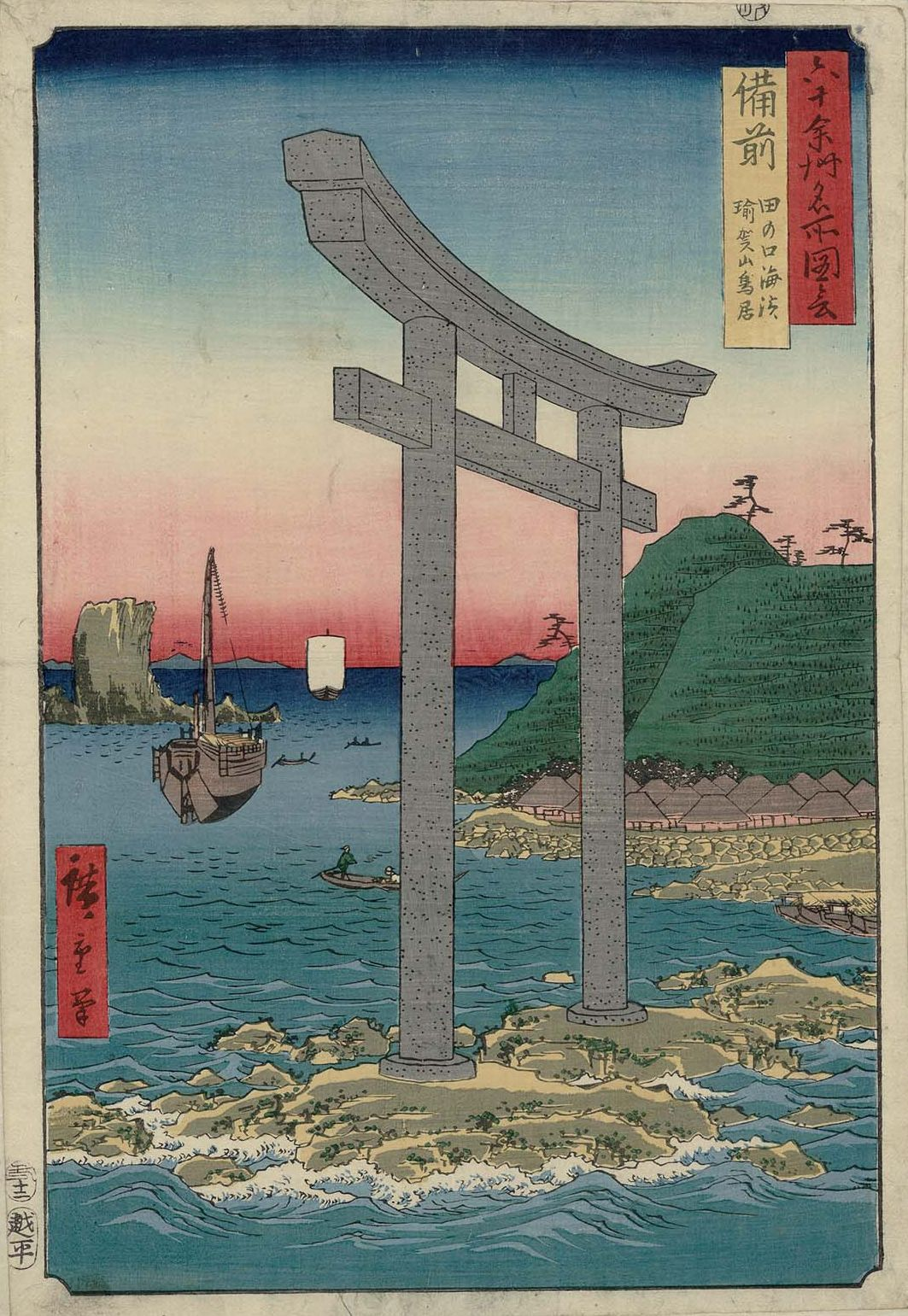
Hiroshige ukiyo-e "Bizen" in "The Famous Scenes of the Sixty States" (六十余州名所図会)

== History ==
After its conquest, the ancient Kingdom of Kibi became Kibi Province. It was divided into Bizen (備前), Bitchū (備中), and Bingo (備後) Provinces in the Ritsuryō administrative reforms in the late 7th century, with "Bizen" taking the first kanji of its name from "Kibi" and the second from its geographic position closest to the capital. Bizen Province at this time included the territory of what would later become Mimasaka Province, Tsurashima (Torago, Kojima County), Shōdoshima, and the northern part of the Naoshima Islands. In 713, the six northern counties of Eita, Katsuta, Tomata, Kume and Mashima were separated from Bizen to form Mimasaka Province.

Bizen, with much flat land and many rivers of reasonable size for flood control and water transportation, has been suitable for agriculture since ancient times. It has been an iron production area since the Kofun period, and also had salt fields along its coast with the Seto Inland Sea, which also provided for convenience of marine transportation to the Kinai region Shikoku and Kyushu. The province was economically prosperous, and although its area as not large, it was ranked as a "superior country" under the Ritsuryō classification system.

The location of the Bizen kokufu is uncertain. Per the Wamyō Ruijushō it was located in Mino District. However, ruins discovered in Joto District in what his now the Kokufuichi neighborhood of Naka-ku, Okayama (34°41′31.56″N 133°57′23.14″E have been officially designated by the government as an Okayama Prefectural Historic Site. The designation is controversial as it was largely based on the geographic name of the site, which may or may not date to the Nara period.

The location of the Bizen Kokubun-ji is well defined, and is located in the city of Akaiwa, Okayama. It is located about 6.5 kilometers northeast of the estimated location of Bizen Kokufu. The foundations of the main temple buildings have been discovered, and the site is a National Historic Site. The presumed ruins of the Bizen Kokubun-niji are located 300 meters south of the monastery site. The details are not clear because no full-scale investigation has been conducted and the site is not covered by the National Historic Site designation,

The ichinomiya of the province is Kibitsuhiko Shrine, located in Kita-ku, Okayama.

Many shōen landed estates developed in the province during the Heian and Kamakura periods, and during this time the province also became famous for its production of Japanese swords, especially that of the Osafune school and the Ichimonji schools. Bizen ware pottery also developed during this period, but did not reach national prominence for several centuries.

In the Muromachi period, the Akamatsu clan, based in Harima Province, came to serve as shugo. When the power of the Akamatsu clan declined, the power of the Yamana clan increased, and Bizen gradually became a battlefield between the two clans and their proxies. During the Sengoku period, the Urakami clan, the shugodai, tried to rule Bizen Province by usurping the power of the Akamatsu clan, but were defeated by Amago Haruhisa, a powerful warlord from the San'in region. However, when the Amago clan declined, Ukita Naoie, a vassal of the Urakami clan, drove out the remnants of Urakami clan, and conquered Mimasaka Province and parts of Bitchū and Bizen Province to become a daimyō of the Sengoku period. He established Okayama as his stronghold. His successor, Ukita Hideie was defeated at the 1600 Battle of Sekigahara and dispossessed by Tokugawa Ieyasu, who awarded Okayama to Kobayakawa Hideaki. When Kobayakawa Hideaki died without heir, Okayama Castle and all of Bizen Province was awarded to Ikeda Tadatsugu, the second son of Ikeda Terumasa. The Ikeda clan continued to rule all of Bizen Province until the Meiji restoration.

Under the Meiji government, on August 29, 1871, Bizen Province became part of Okayama Prefecture, with the exception of its islands in the Seto Inland Sea, which were transferred to Kagawa Prefecture and Ehime Prefecture. A small area of former Bizen Province was transferred to Akō, Hyōgo in 1963 at the request of is local inhabitants.

Per the early Meiji period Kyudaka kyuryo Torishirabe-chō (旧高旧領取調帳), an official government assessment of the nation’s resources, the province had 680 villages with a total kokudaka of 423,379 koku.

Bakumatsu period domains
Name	Clan	Type	kokudaka
Okayama	Ikeda clan	Tozama	315,000 koku

Districts of Bizen Province
District	kokudaka	Villages	at present
Akasaka District (赤坂郡)	44,009 koku	94 villages	merged with Iwanashi District to become Akaiwa District (赤磐郡) on April 1, 1900; now parts of Kita-ku, Okayama and Akaiwa
Iwanashi District (磐梨郡)	26,735 koku	64 villages	merged with Akasaka District to become Akaiwa District on April 1, 1900; now parts of Higashi-ku, Okayama, Akaiwa, Wake
Jōdō District (上道郡)	102,948 koku	108 villages	dissolved; now parts of Kita-ku, Okayama, Naka-ku, Okayama, Higashi-ku, Okayama,
Kojima District (児島郡)	49,342 koku	91 villages	dissolved: now Tamano, parts of Minami-ku, Okayama, Kurashiki,
Mino District (御野郡)	52,282 koku	62 villages	merged with Tsudaka District to become Mitsu District (御津郡) on April 1, 1900 now parts of Kita-ku, Okayama, Minami-ku, Okayama,
Oku District (邑久郡)	70,400 koku	79 villages	dissolved: now Setouchi, parts of Higashi-ku, Okayama, Bizen
Tsudaka District (津高郡)	48,929 koku	93 villages	merged with Mino District to become Mitsu District on April 1, 1900; now parts of Kita-ku, Okayama, Kibichūō, Misaki
Wake District (和気郡)	28,730 koku	89 villages	now Wake, parts of Higashi-ku, Okayama, Bizen, Akaiwa, Akō, Hyōgo

== Gallery ==
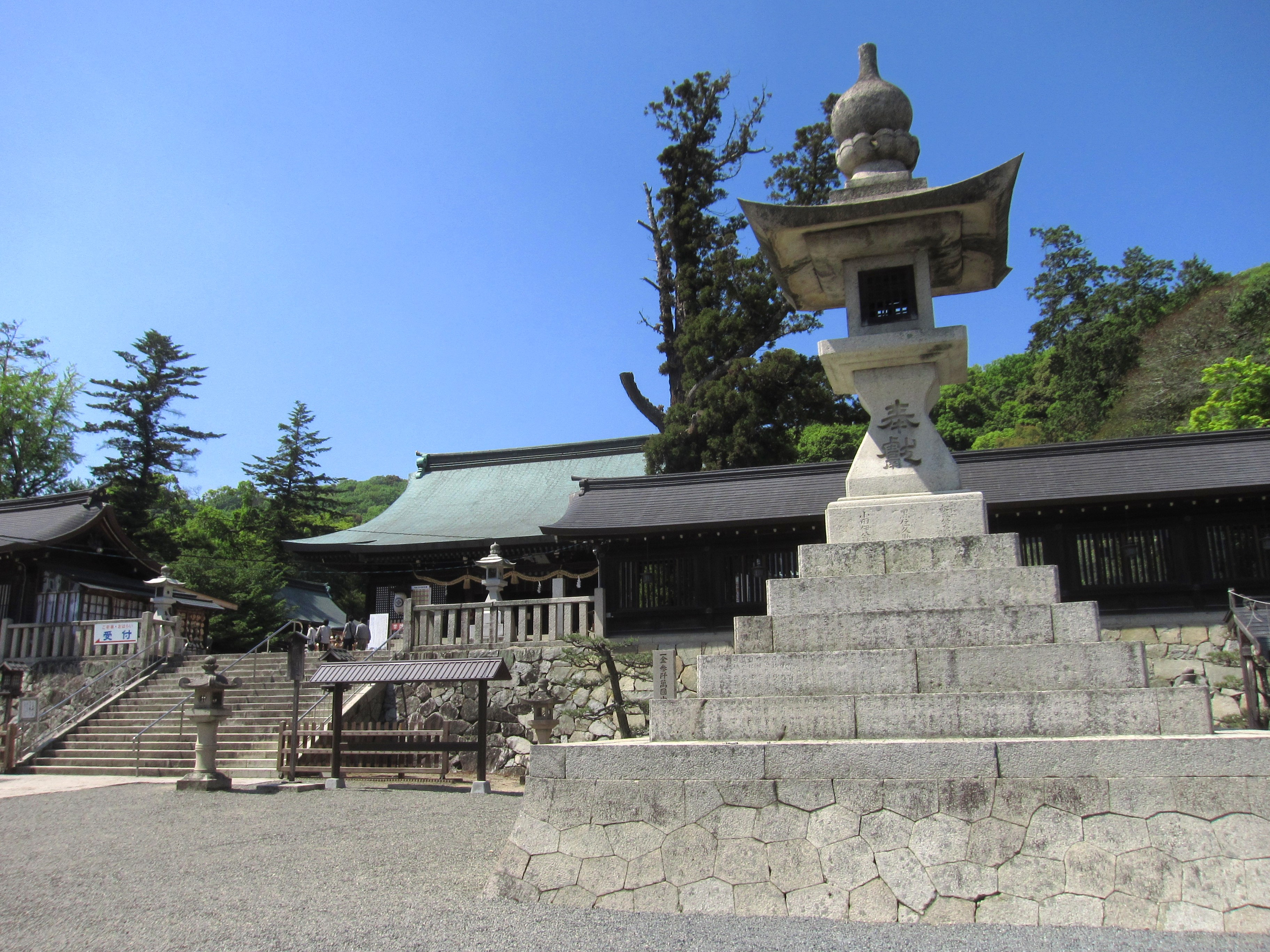
Kibitsuhiko Jinja, the ichinomiya of the province

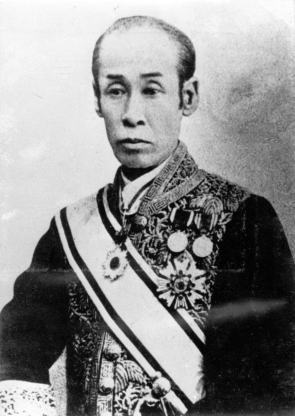
Ikeda Akimasa, last daimyō of Okayama

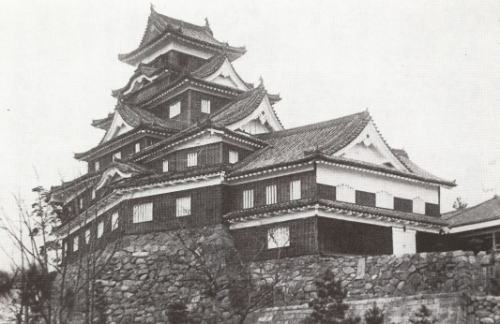
Okayama Castle before 1945

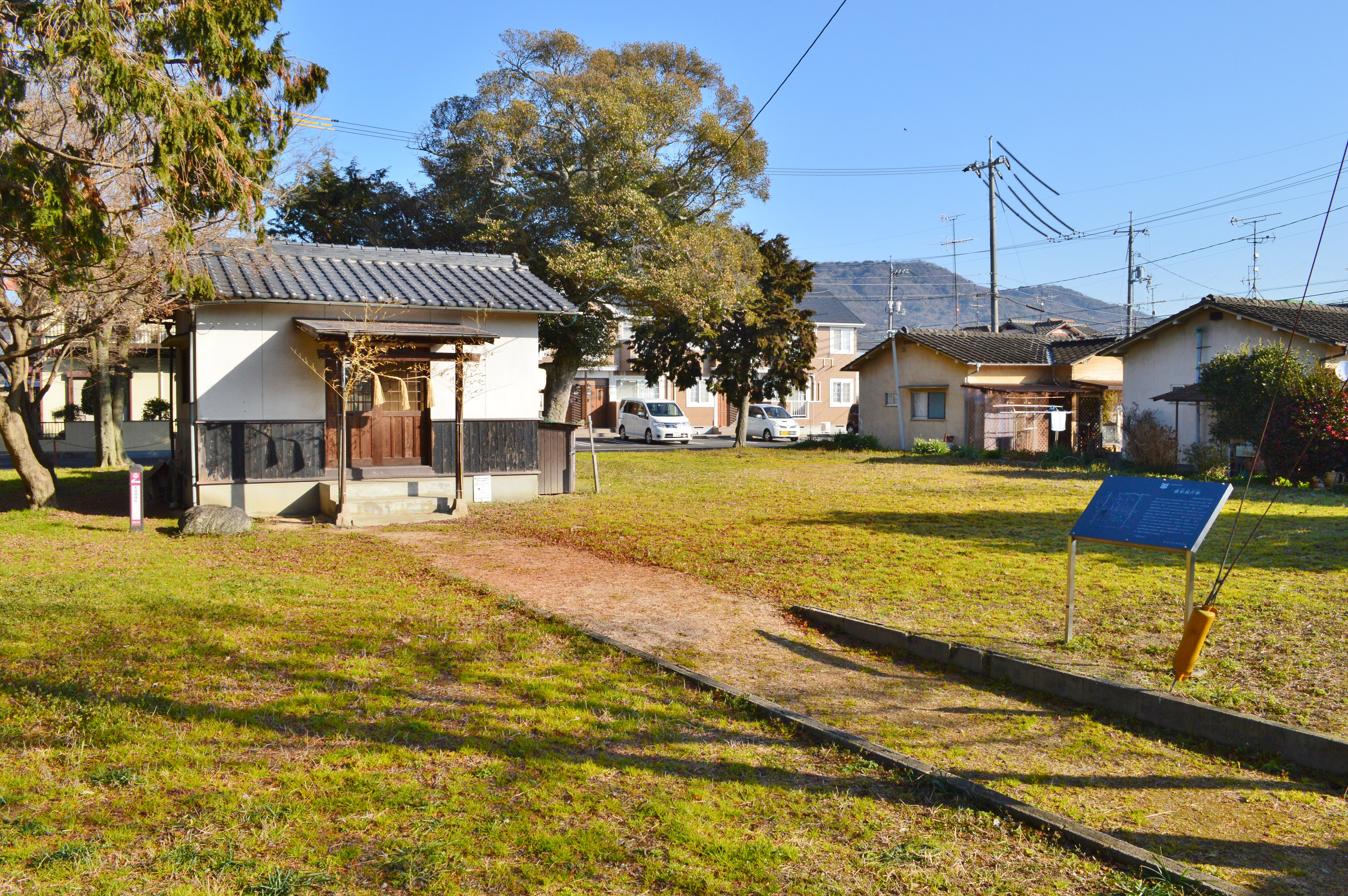
Site of the Bizen Kokufu
