= Iri station =

Railway station in Bizen, Okayama Prefecture, Japan

Iri Station 伊里駅
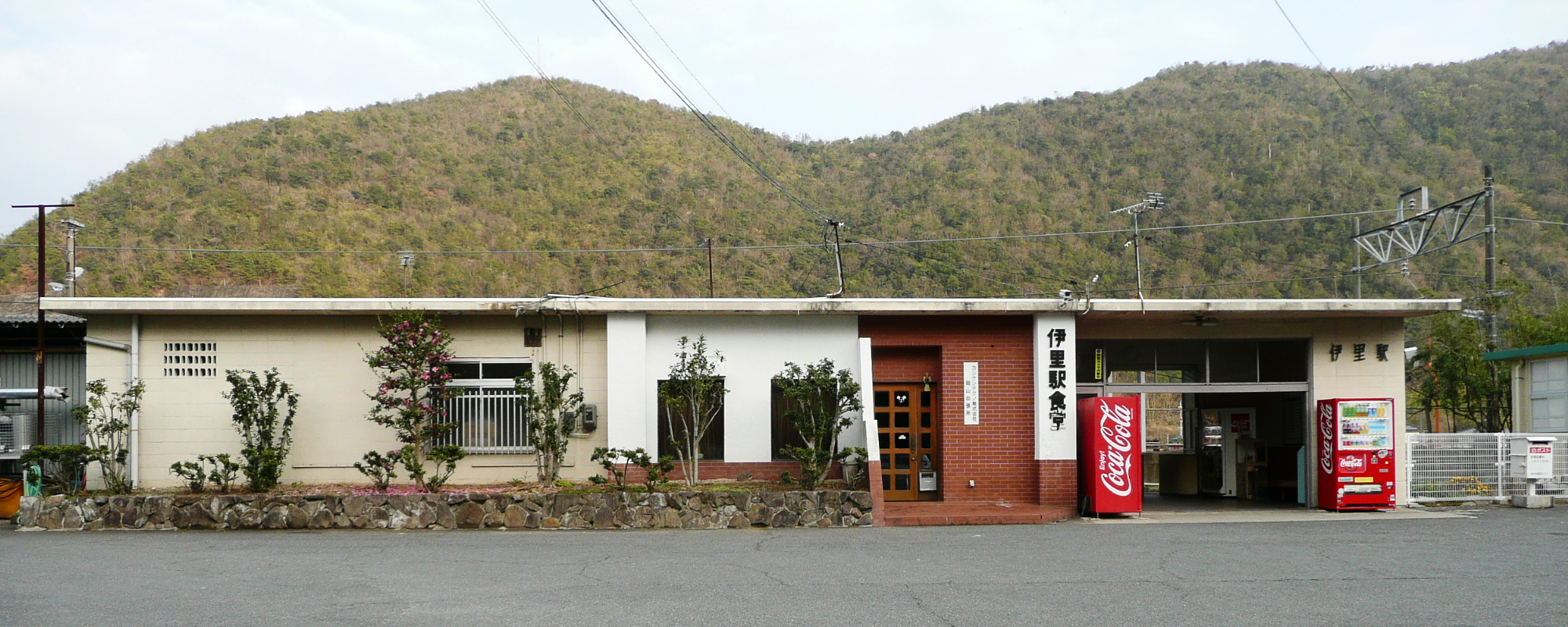
- Iri Station in January 2008

General information
- Location: Honami 17-1, Bizen-shi, Okayama-ken 705-0033; Japan
- Coordinates: 34°44′29.54″N 134°13′28.07″E
- Owner: West Japan Railway Company
- Operator: West Japan Railway Company
- Line: N Akō Line
- Distance: 27.7 km (17.2 miles) from Aioi
- Platforms: 1 side platform
- Tracks: 1
- Connections: Bus stop

Other information
- Status: Unstaffed
- Station code: JR-N14
- Website: Official website

History
- Opened: 25 March 1958

Passengers
- FY2019: 180 daily
Location
- Location within Okayama Prefecture Location within Japan

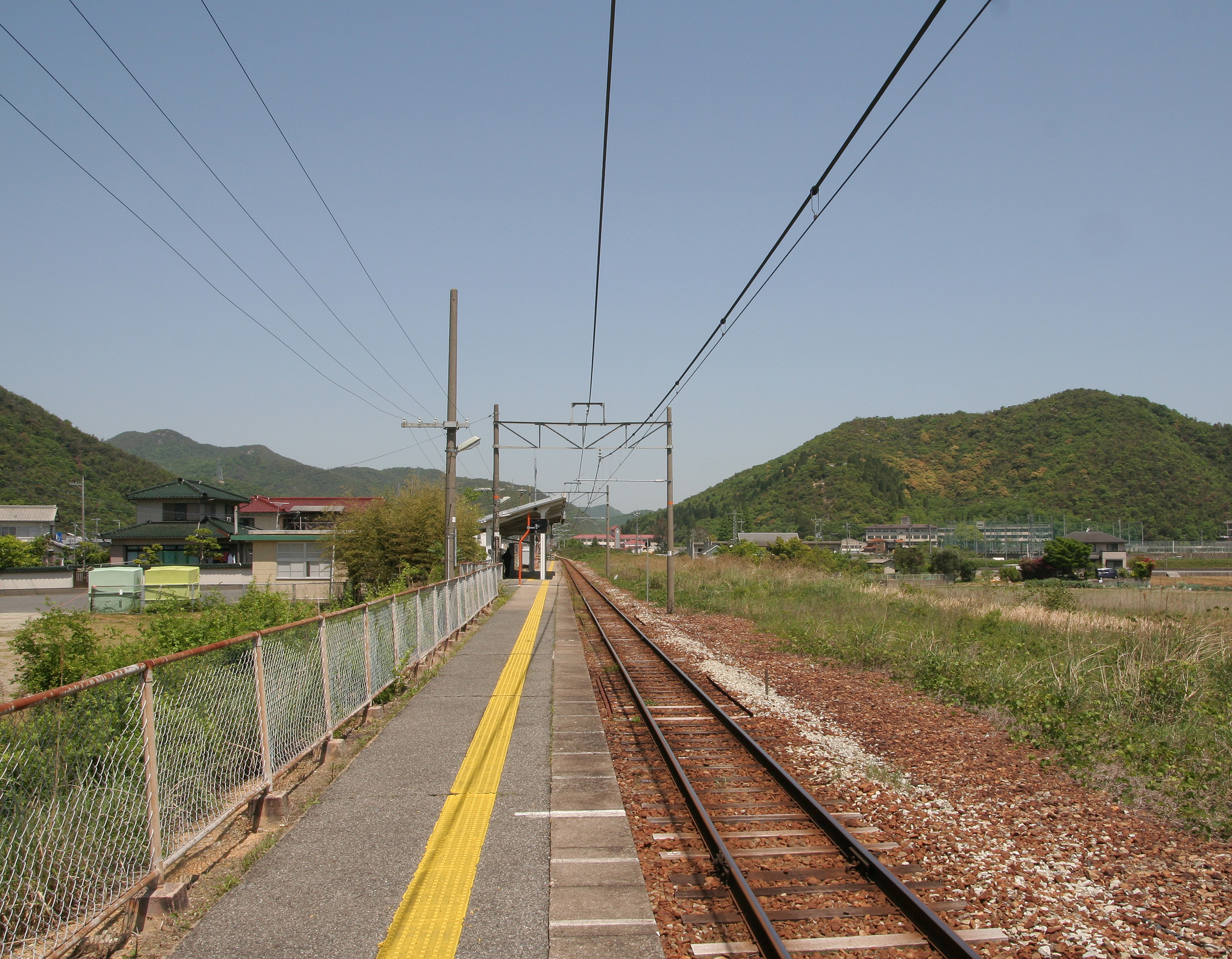
Platform

Iri station (伊里駅, Iri-eki) is a passenger railway station located in the city of Bizen, Okayama Prefecture, Japan, operated by the West Japan Railway Company (JR West).

== Lines ==
Iri Station is served by the JR Akō Line, and is located 27.7 kilometers from the terminus of the line at Aioi and 17.2 kilometers from Banshū-Akō.

== Station layout ==
The station consists of one side platform serving a single bi-directional track. The station is unattended.

== Adjacent stations ==
| « | Service | » |
JR West Akō Line
| Hinase | - | Bizen-Katakami |

== History ==
Iri Station was opened on 25 March 1958. With the privatization of Japanese National Railways (JNR) on 1 April 1987, the station came under the control of JR West.

== Passenger statistics ==
In fiscal 2019, the station was used by an average of 180 passengers daily

== Surrounding area ==
- Bizen Municipal Iri Junior High School (former Okayama Prefectural Bizen Higashi High School)
- Bizen Municipal Iri Elementary School
- Japan National Route 250

== See also ==
- List of railway stations in Japan
