= Bizen-Fukukawa Station =

Railway station in Akō, Hyōgo Prefecture, Japan

Bizen-Fukukawa Station 備前福河駅
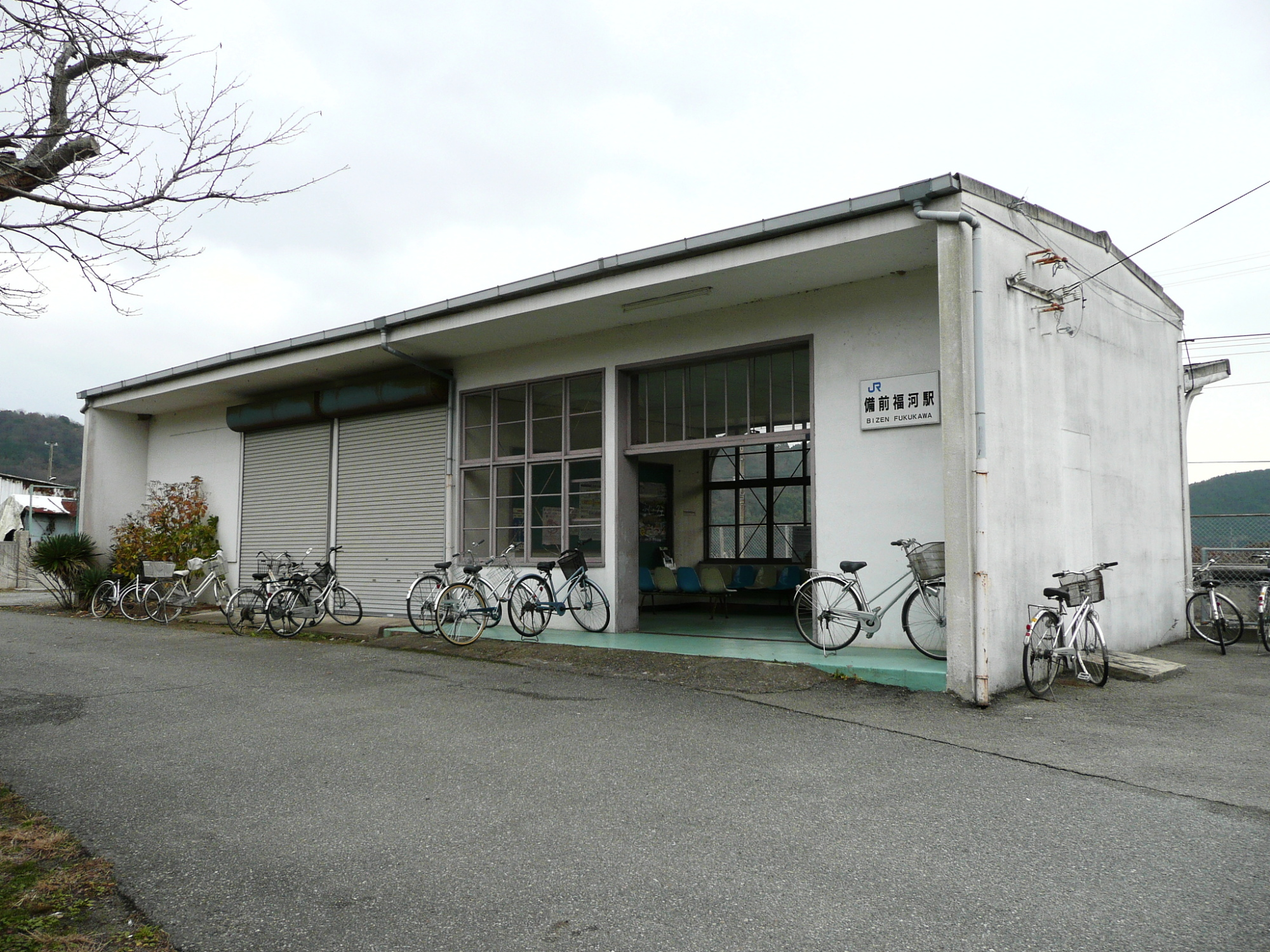
- Bizen-Fukukawa Station in January 2008

General information
- Location: Fukuura, Akō-shi, Hyōgo-ken 678-0257; Japan
- Coordinates: 34.7466°N 134.3317°E
- Owner: West Japan Railway Company
- Operator: West Japan Railway Company
- Line: Akō Line
- Distance: 16.4 km (10.2 miles) from Aioi
- Platforms: 1 side platform
- Connections: Bus stop

Construction
- Structure type: Ground level
- Accessible: None

Other information
- Status: Unstaffed
- Website: Official website

History
- Opened: 1 March 1955

Passengers
- FY2019: 30 daily
Location
- Location within Hyōgo Prefecture Location within Japan

Bizen-Fukukawa Station (備前福河駅, Bizen-Fukukawa-eki) is a passenger railway station located in the city of Akō, Hyōgo Prefecture, Japan, operated by the West Japan Railway Company (JR West).

== Lines ==
Bizen-Fukukawa Station is served by the Akō Line, and is located 16.4 kilometers from the terminus of the line at Aioi, and 5.9 kilometers from Banshū-Akō.

== Station layout ==
The station consists of one ground-level side platform serving a single-directional track, with the station building on the right side when facing in the direction of Okayama. The station is unattended. When the station was opened, it had an island platform, but only one side of the platform was used for passenger operations, with the other side used exclusively for freight. The railroad tracks are slightly S-shaped at both ends of the station. This is a remnant of a plan to draw another railroad track on the south side of the existing track so that express trains could pass; however, as the Akō Line was later determined to be used only for local operations, this plan was never completed.

== Adjacent stations ==
«	Service	»
JR West
Akō Line
Tenwa	-	Sōgo

== History ==
Bizen-Fukukawa Station was opened on March 1, 1955. At the time, the local municipality was Fukukawa village in Wake district of Okayama Prefecture, hence the use of "Bizen" in the station name (as Bizen province was part of what is now Okayama. However, on September 1, 1963, the village was transferred to Hyōgo prefecture. With the privatization of the Japan National Railways (JNR) on April 1, 1987, the station came under the aegis of the West Japan Railway Company.

== Passenger statistics ==
In fiscal 2019, the station was used by an average of 30 passengers daily

== Surrounding area ==
- Hyogo West Agricultural Cooperative (JA Hyogo West) Shioya Branch
- Japan National Route 250

== See also ==
- List of railway stations in Japan
