= Ōdomi Station =

Railway station in Setouchi, Okayama Prefecture, Japan

Ōdomi Station 大富駅
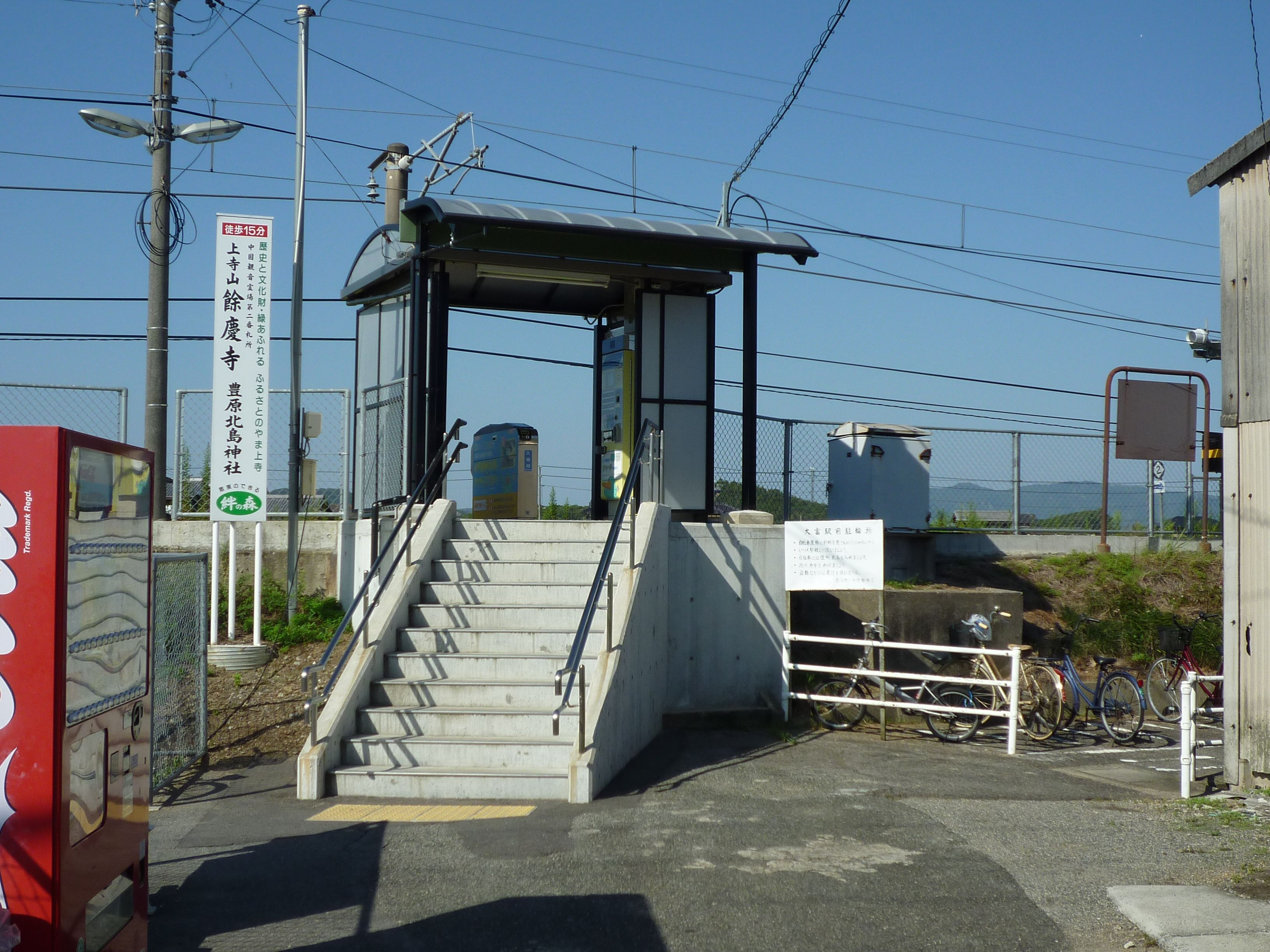
- Ōdomi Station in October 2009

General information
- Location: Oku-cho Odomi, Setouchi-shi, Okayama-ken 701-4234; Japan
- Coordinates: 34°39′41.05″N 134°4′14.80″E
- Owner: West Japan Railway Company
- Operator: West Japan Railway Company
- Line: N Akō Line
- Distance: 48.0 km (29.8 miles) from Aioi
- Platforms: 1 side platform
- Tracks: 1
- Connections: Bus stop

Other information
- Status: Unstaffed
- Station code: JR-N07
- Website: Official website

History
- Opened: 1 September 1962

Passengers
- FY2019: 239 daily
Location
- Location within Okayama Prefecture Location within Japan

Ōdomi Station (大富駅, Ōdomi-eki) is a passenger railway station located in the city of Setouchi, Okayama Prefecture, Japan, operated by the West Japan Railway Company (JR West).

== Lines ==
Ōdomi Station is served by the JR Akō Line, and is located 48.0 kilometers from the terminus of the line at Aioi and 37.5 kilometers from Banshū-Akō.

== Station layout ==
The station consists of one side platform serving single bi-directional track. There is no station building, and the station is unattended.

== Adjacent stations ==
«	Service	»
JR West Akō Line
Oku	-	Saidaiji

== History ==
Ōdomi Station was opened on 1 September 1962. With the privatization of Japanese National Railways (JNR) on 1 April 1987, the station came under the control of JR West.

== Passenger statistics ==
In fiscal 2019, the station was used by an average of 239 passengers daily

== Surrounding area ==
- Setouchi Municipal Imagi Elementary School

== See also ==
- List of railway stations in Japan
