= Imbe Station =

Railway station in Bizen, Okayama Prefecture, Japan

Imbe Station 伊部駅
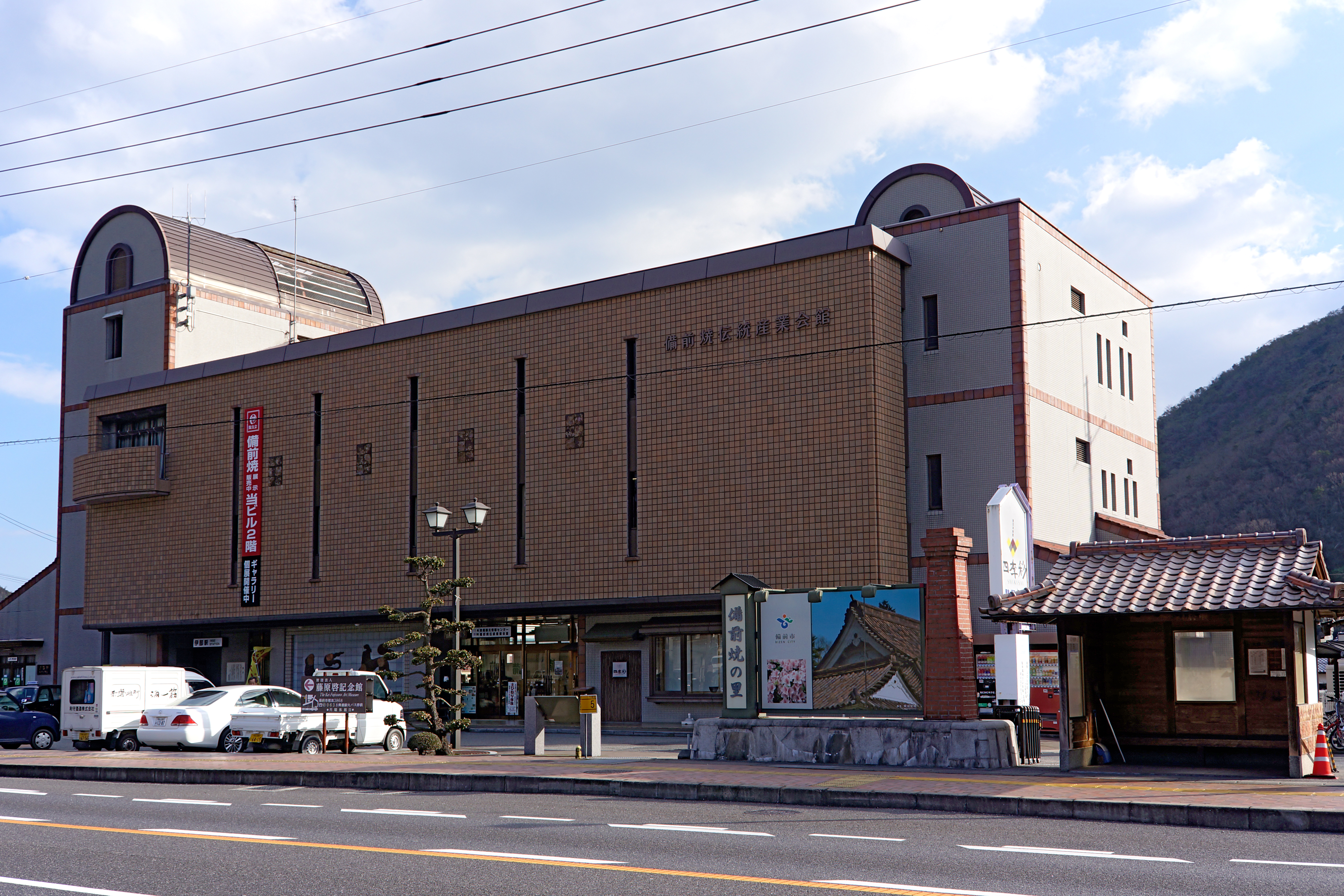
- Bizen Ware Traditional Industries Hall, where the station's north gate is located

General information
- Location: 1685-1 Imbe, Bizen-shi, Okayama-ken 705-0001; Japan
- Coordinates: 34°44′19.57″N 134°9′38.07″E
- Owner: West Japan Railway Company
- Operator: West Japan Railway Company
- Line: N Akō Line
- Distance: 34.5 km (21.4 miles) from Aioi
- Platforms: 2 side platforms
- Tracks: 2
- Connections: Bus stop

Other information
- Status: Unstaffed
- Station code: JR-N11
- Website: Official website

History
- Opened: 25 March 1958

Passengers
- FY2019: 459 daily
Location
- Location within Okayama Prefecture Location within Japan

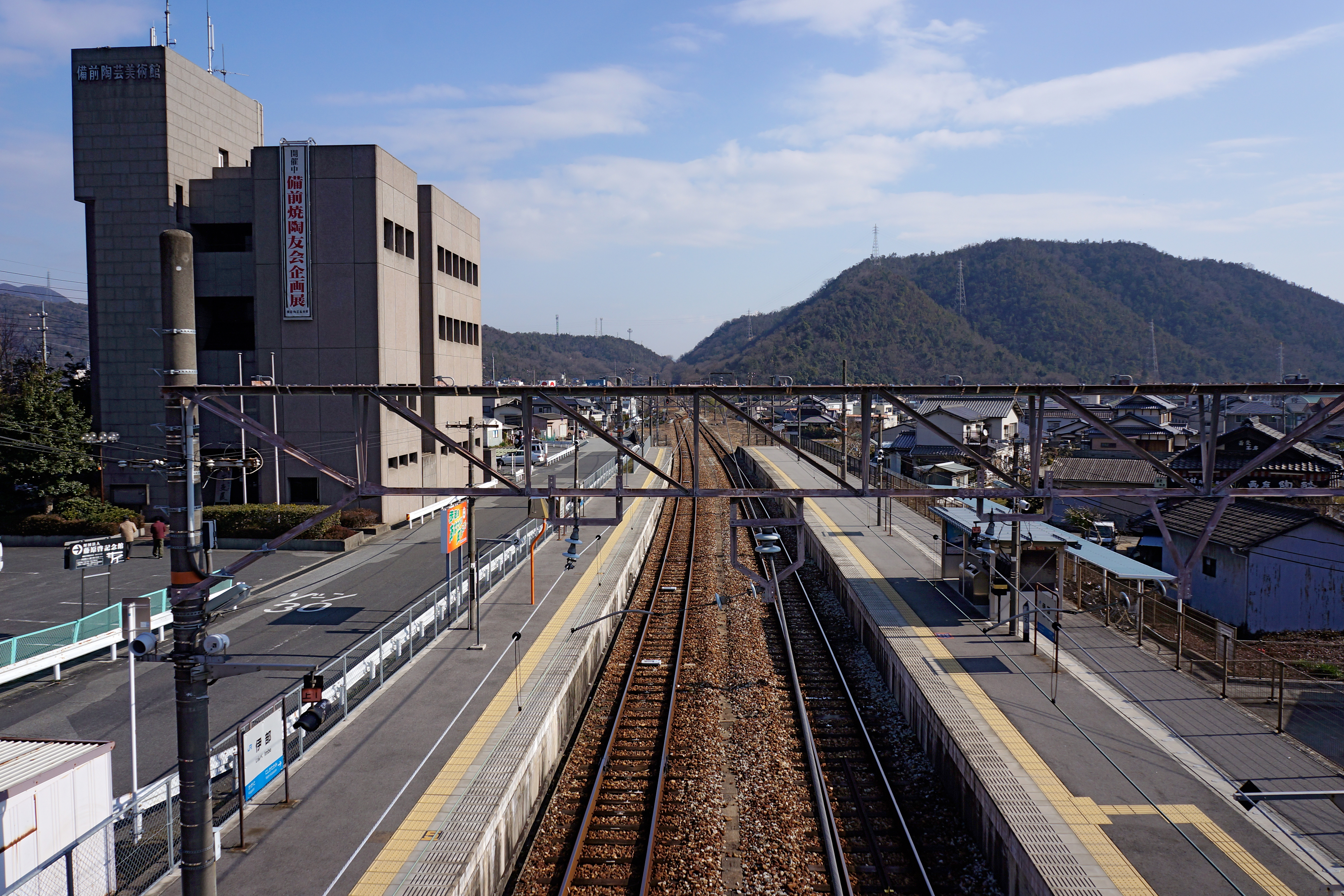
Platform

Imbe Station (伊部駅, Inbe-eki) is a passenger railway station located in the Imbe neighborhood of the city of Bizen, Okayama Prefecture, Japan, operated by the West Japan Railway Company (JR West).

== Lines ==
Imbe Station is served by the JR Akō Line, and is located 34.5 kilometers from the terminus of the line at Aioi and 24.0 kilometers from Banshū-Akō.

== Station layout ==
The station consists of two ground-level opposed side platforms connected by a footbridge. The station building is on the side of Platform 1 of the side platform, and there are two crew accommodations next to the station building. The island platform has Platform 2 and 3 and is connected by a footbridge. The north exit is located on the first floor of the Bizen Ware Museum of Traditional Crafts. The station is unattended.

=== Platforms ===
| 1 | ■ N Akō Line | for Okayama, Fukuyama and Niimi |
| 2 | ■ N Akō Line | for Banshū-Akō |

== Adjacent stations ==
| « | Service | » |
JR West Akō Line
| Nishi-Katakami | - | Kagato |

== History ==
Imbe Station was opened on 25 March 1958. With the privatization of Japanese National Railways (JNR) on 1 April 1987, the station came under the control of JR West.

== Passenger statistics ==
In fiscal 2019, the station was used by an average of 459 passengers daily

== Surrounding area ==
- Bizen City Bizen Ware Museum
- Bizen Pottery Traditional Industry Center
- Bizen Municipal Imbe Elementary School
- Bizen Municipal Bizen Junior High School
- Japan National Route 2

== See also ==
- List of railway stations in Japan
