= Bizen-Katakami Station =

Railway station in Bizen, Okayama Prefecture, Japan

Bizen-Katakami Station 備前片上駅
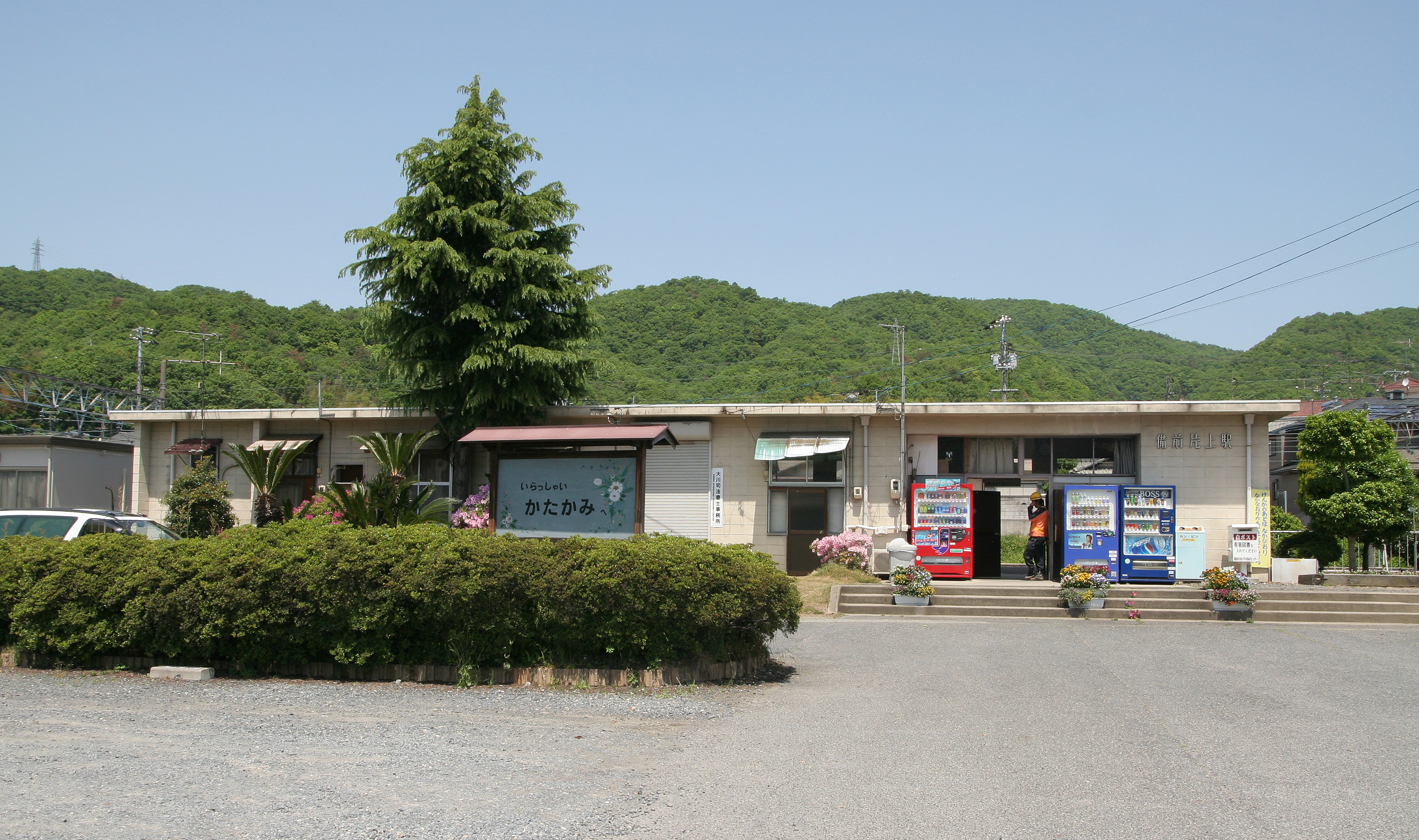
- Bizen-Katakami Station in May 2008

General information
- Location: Higashikatakami 518, Bizen-shi, Okayama-ken 705-0022; Japan
- Coordinates: 34°44′53.5″N 134°11′49.4″E
- Owner: West Japan Railway Company
- Operator: West Japan Railway Company
- Line: N Akō Line
- Distance: 31.0 km (19.3 miles) from Aioi
- Platforms: 1 side + 1 island platform
- Tracks: 2
- Connections: Bus stop

Other information
- Status: Unstaffed
- Station code: JR-N13
- Website: Official website

History
- Opened: 25 March 1958

Passengers
- FY2019: 150 daily
Location
- Location within Okayama Prefecture Location within Japan

Bizen-Katakami Station (備前片上駅, Bizen-Katakami-eki) is a passenger railway station located in the city of Bizen, Okayama Prefecture, Japan, operated by the West Japan Railway Company (JR West).

== Lines ==
Bizen-Katakami Station is served by the JR Akō Line, and is located 31.0 kilometers from the terminus of the line at Aioi and 21.56 kilometers from Banshū-Akō.

== Station layout ==
The station consists of one side platform and one island platform and three tracks. The station building is on the side of Platform 1 of the side platform, and there are two crew accommodations next to the station building. The island platform has Platform 2 and 3 and is connected by a footbridge. The station is unattended.

=== Platforms ===
1	■ N Akō Line	for Okayama, Fukuyama and Niimi
2, 3	■ N Akō Line	for Banshū-Akō

== Adjacent stations ==
«	Service	»
JR West Akō Line
Iri	-	Nishi-Katakami

== History ==
Bizen-Katakami Station was opened on 25 March 1958. With the privatization of Japanese National Railways (JNR) on 1 April 1987, the station came under the control of JR West.

== Passenger statistics ==
In fiscal 2019, the station was used by an average of 150 passengers daily

== Surrounding area ==
- Bizen City Hall
- Japan National Route 2

== See also ==
- List of railway stations in Japan
