= Nishi-Katakami Station =

Railway station in Bizen, Okayama Prefecture, Japan

Nishi-Katakami Station 西片上駅
- Nishi-Katakami Station in April 2026

General information
- Location: Nishikatakami 87-3, Bizen-shi, Okayama-ken 705-0021; Japan
- Coordinates: 34°44′42.7″N 134°11′0.8″E
- Owner: West Japan Railway Company
- Operator: West Japan Railway Company
- Line: N Akō Line
- Distance: 32.3 km (20.1 miles) from Aioi
- Platforms: 1 side platform
- Tracks: 1
- Connections: Bus stop

Other information
- Status: Unstaffed
- Station code: JR-N12
- Website: Official website

History
- Opened: 1 May 1963

Passengers
- FY2019: 589 daily
Location
- Location within Okayama Prefecture Location within Japan

Platform

Nishi-Katakami Station (西片上駅, Nishi-Katakami-eki) is a passenger railway station located in the city of Bizen, Okayama Prefecture, Japan, operated by the West Japan Railway Company (JR West).

== Lines ==
Nishi-Katakami Station is served by the JR Akō Line, and is located 32.3 kilometers from the terminus of the line at Aioi and 21.8 kilometers from Banshū-Akō.

== Station layout ==
The station consists of one side platform serving single bi-directional track. Because it is located on an embankment, it is quite high from surrounding houses. The station is are located along Japan National Route 2, but the station building and platform are three stories or higher above the surrounding town.

== Adjacent stations ==
«	Service	»
JR West Akō Line
Bizen-Katakami	-	Imbe

== History ==
Nishi-Katakami Station was opened on 1 May 1963. With the privatization of Japanese National Railways (JNR) on 1 April 1987, the station came under the control of JR West.

== Passenger statistics ==
In fiscal 2019, the station was used by an average of 589 passengers daily

== Surrounding area ==
- Bizen City Hall
- Japan National Route 2
- Okayama Prefectural Bizen Ryokuyo High School (former Okayama Prefectural Bizen High School)
- Bizen City Katakami High School

== See also ==
- List of railway stations in Japan
