= Akō =

Akō 赤穂市
- City
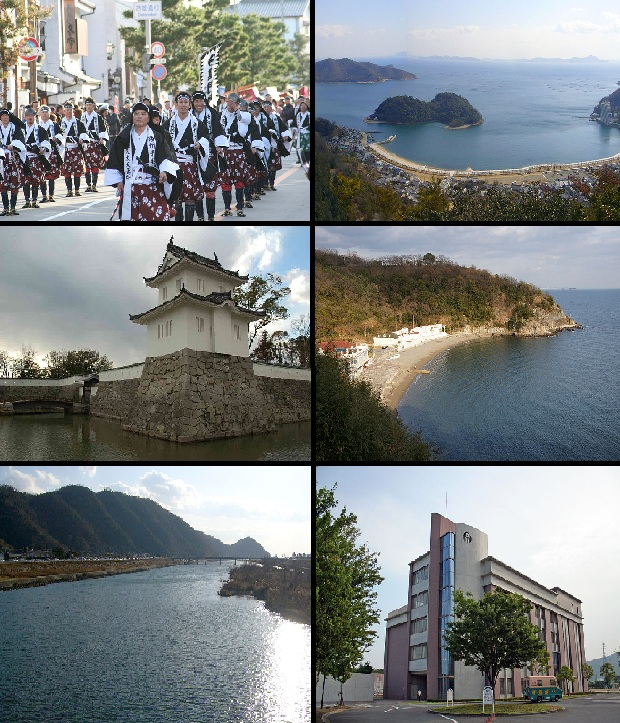
Akō Festival	Sakoshi Bay
Akō Castle	Cape Misaki
Chikusa River	Kansai University of Social Welfare
- Flag Emblem

- Location of Akō in Hyōgo Prefecture

- Location in Japan
- Coordinates: 34°45′06″N 134°23′35″E
- Country: Japan
- Region: Kansai
- Prefecture: Hyōgo

Government
  - Mayor: Masatoshi Murei (since 2019)

Area
  - Total: 126.85 km^{2} (48.98 sq mi)

Population (May 31, 2022)
  - Total: 45,747
  - Density: 360.64/km^{2} (934.05/sq mi)
- Time zone: UTC+09:00 (JST)
- City hall address: Kariya 81, Akō-shi, Hyōgo-ken 678-0292
- Website: Official website
- Symbols
- Flower: Azalea
- Tree: Cherry blossom

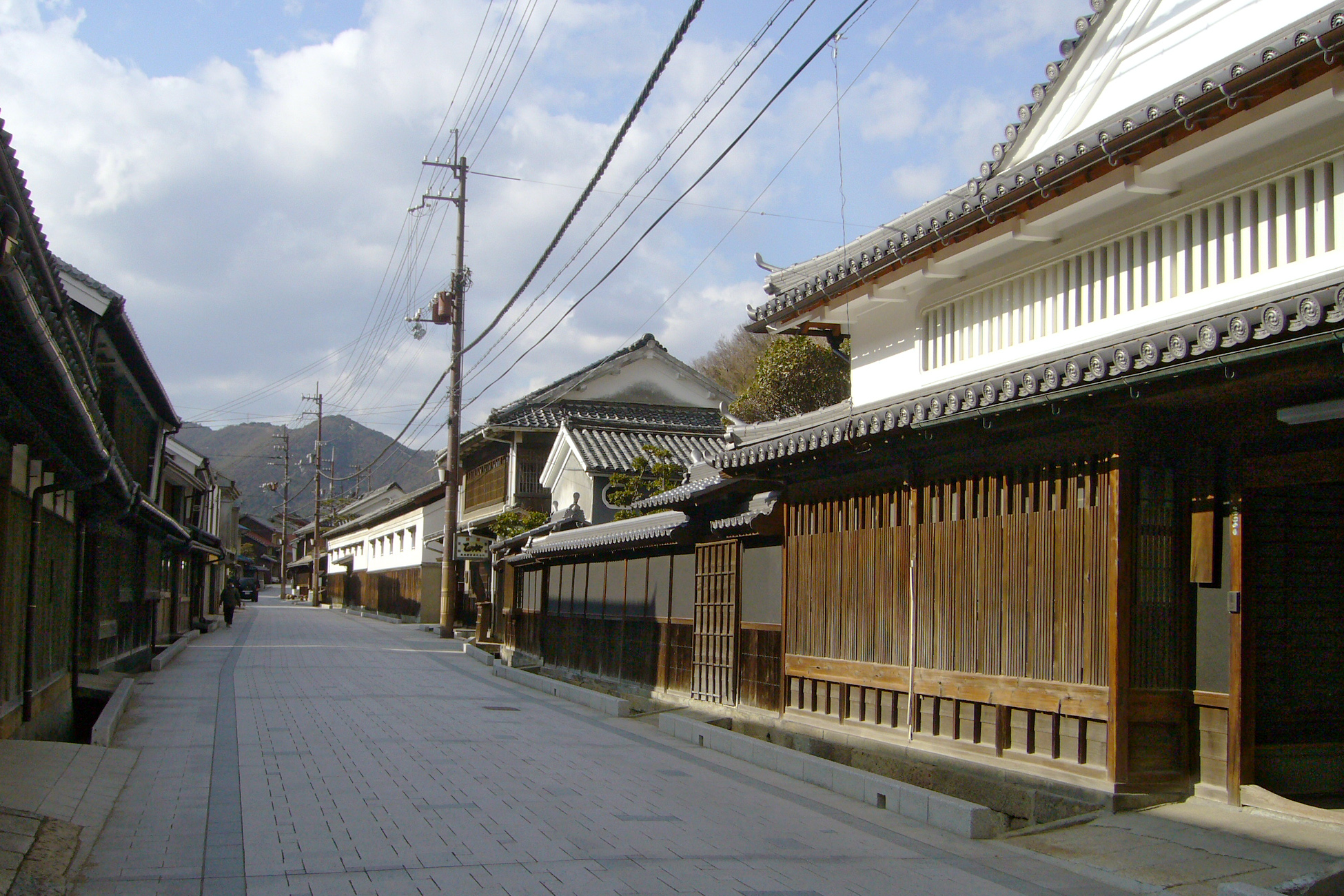
Main street in Sakoshi

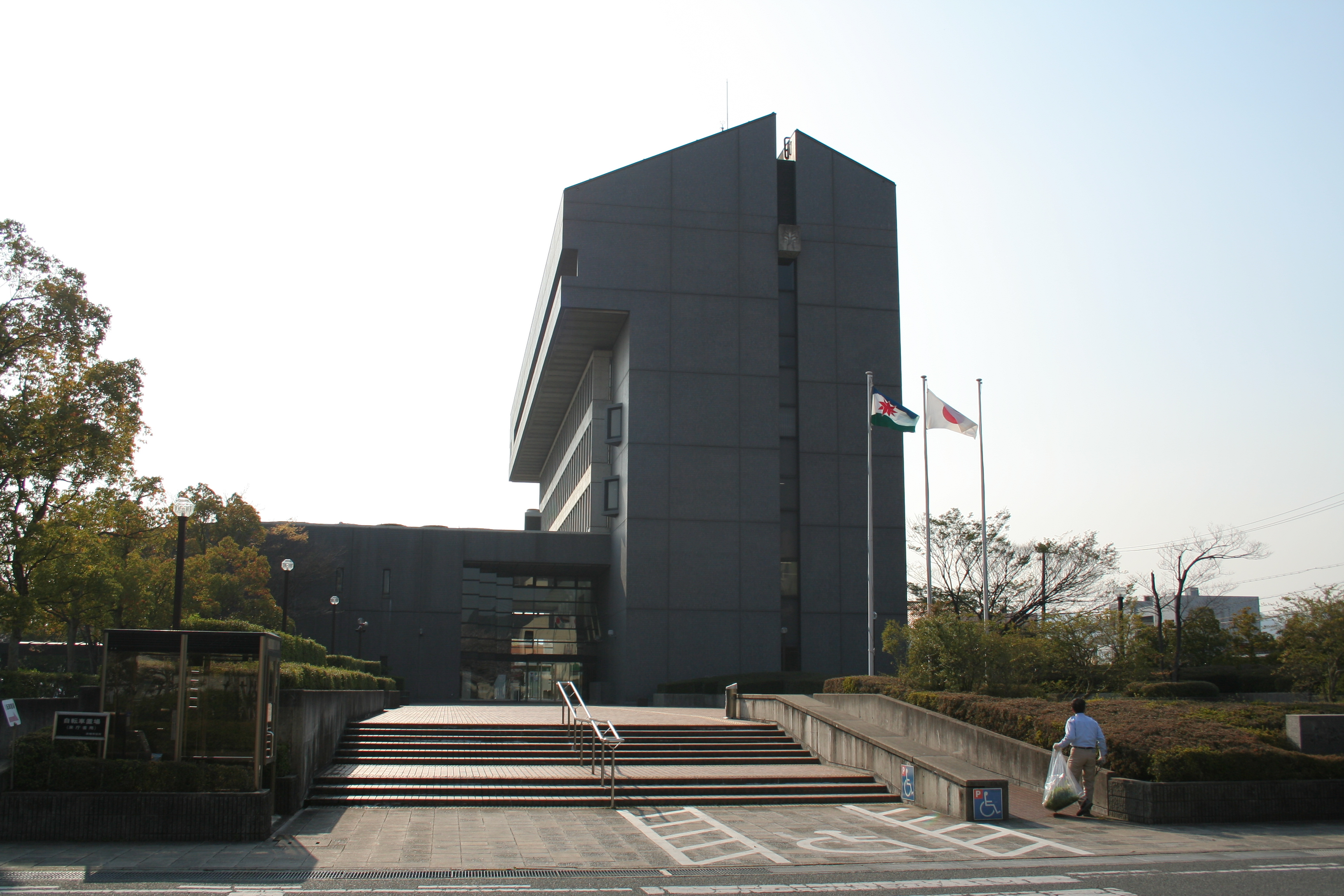
Akō City Hall

Akō (赤穂市, Akō-shi; Japanese pronunciation: [ä́.kò̞ò̞, ä̀.kó̞ò̞.ɕì]) is a city located in southwestern Hyōgo Prefecture, Japan. As of 31 May 2022, the city had an estimated population of 45,747 in 20,563 households and a population density of 360 persons per km^{2}. The total area of the city is 126.85 square kilometres (48.98 sq mi).

== Geography ==
Akō is located in far southwestern Hyōgo Prefecture. The city is on the border of the Hyōgo and Okayama prefectures, which also divides the Kinki and Chūgoku areas. On each side of the border, ancient Harima and Bizen provinces, which are now Akō and Bizen cities, respectively (except for the former village of Fukukawa, now part of Akō but formerly belonging to Bizen Province), have cultivated their own cultures. Therefore, even at the present days, dialects are vastly different on the sides of the border. A traveller from west to east on the JR San'yō Main Line will notice that the dialect of passengers suddenly changes between Kamigori station in Hyogo prefecture and Mitsuishi station in Okayama prefecture. In Akō, people speak a type of the Kansai dialect whose intonation is however of the Tokyo type. The superset of the dialect spoken in Akō, called Banshū-ben, is known as one of the harshest-sounding dialects. The Chikusa River flows through the center of the city, providing the moat of Akō Castle with water through a branch, Kariya River. The central part of the city around the castle has been built on the alluvial plain of Chikusa River. Parts of the city are within the borders of the Setonaikai National Park.

=== Neighboring municipalities ===
Hyōgo Prefecture

- Aioi
- Kamigōri

Okayama Prefecture

- Bizen

=== Climate ===
Akō has a humid subtropical climate (Köppen Cfa) characterized by warm summers and cool winters with light to no snowfall. The average annual temperature in Akō is 15.1 °C. The average annual rainfall is 1519 mm with September as the wettest month. The temperatures are highest on average in August, at around 26.1 °C, and lowest in January, at around 4.8 °C.

== Demographics ==
Per Japanese census data, the population of Akō has remained relatively constant over the past 40 years.

Historical population
Year	Pop.	±%
1960	42,381	—
1970	45,942	+8.4%
1980	51,046	+11.1%
1990	51,131	+0.2%
2000	52,077	+1.9%
2010	50,533	−3.0%

== History ==
Akō was part of ancient Harima province, and has been settled since at least the Jomon period, with numerous remains from the Yayoi period and Kofun period found within city limits. During the Edo period, Akō was a capital of Akō Domain, which was noted for its salt production. The town Akō was created with the establishment of the modern municipalities system on April 1, 1889. It was raised to city status on September 1, 1951.

== Government ==
Akō has a mayor-council form of government with a directly elected mayor and a unicameral city council of 18 members. Akō contributes one member to the Hyogo Prefectural Assembly. In terms of national politics, the city is part of Hyōgo 12th district of the lower house of the Diet of Japan.

== Economy ==
Akō has traditionally been famous for salt production was its main industry during the feudal period. Other industries are light manufacturing, commercial fishing, agriculture and tourism thanks to the story of the forty-seven rōnin, as featured in the Chūshingura.

== Education ==
Akō has ten public elementary schools and five public middle schools operated by the city government and one public high schools operated by the Hyōgo Prefectural Department of Education. The prefecture also operates a special education school for the handicapped. The Kansai University of Social Welfare was founded in 1997 is also located in Akō.

== Transportation ==
=== Railway ===
JR West – San'yō Main Line

- Une

JR West – Akō Line

- Sakoshi - Banshū-Akō - Tenwa -Bizen-Fukukawa

=== Highways ===
- San'yō Expressway
- National Route 2
- National Route 250
- National Route 373

== Sister cities ==
- Rockingham, Western Australia, Australia

== Local attractions ==
- Akō Castle, National Historic Site
- Akō Kaihin Koen (赤穂海浜公園) located on the east bank of the Chikusa river at its junction with Setonaikai is a complex of a facility which offers an experience of old-style salt production, camping sites, tennis courts, play grounds, ponds where rental boats are available, and a small zoo.

=== Museums ===
- Akō City Museum of History (赤穂市立歴史博物館) built at the site of former rice granary collects, investigates, and exhibits historical materials related to the city of Akō, especially through the forty-seven rōnin and salt production.
- Akō Tabuchi Memorial Museum of Art (赤穂市立 田淵記念館) has on display a remarkable "Cha no yu (茶の湯)" exhibit.

=== Local specialties ===
- Shiomi Manjū is a Japanese sweet. The outside shell is a little salty while the inside made of azuki paste is very sweet. It goes very well with (strong/bitter) green tea or coffee

=== Festivals ===
- Akō Gishisai, held annually on December 14, in honor of Asano Naganori, the master of the forty-seven rōnin and the events of the Chushingura. On the day of the festival, all the elementary and middle schools in the city are off, and the students and pupils are encouraged to participate in one of the sports and art competitions including those in kendo, judo, and shodō, or one of the parades, including the one re-enacting the victory of the forty-seven rōnin and another one exhibiting the cultural features of the Edo period, such as sankin-kotai.
