= Sōgo Station =

Railway station in Bizen, Okayama Prefecture, Japan

Coordinates: 34.7461°N 134.2978°E

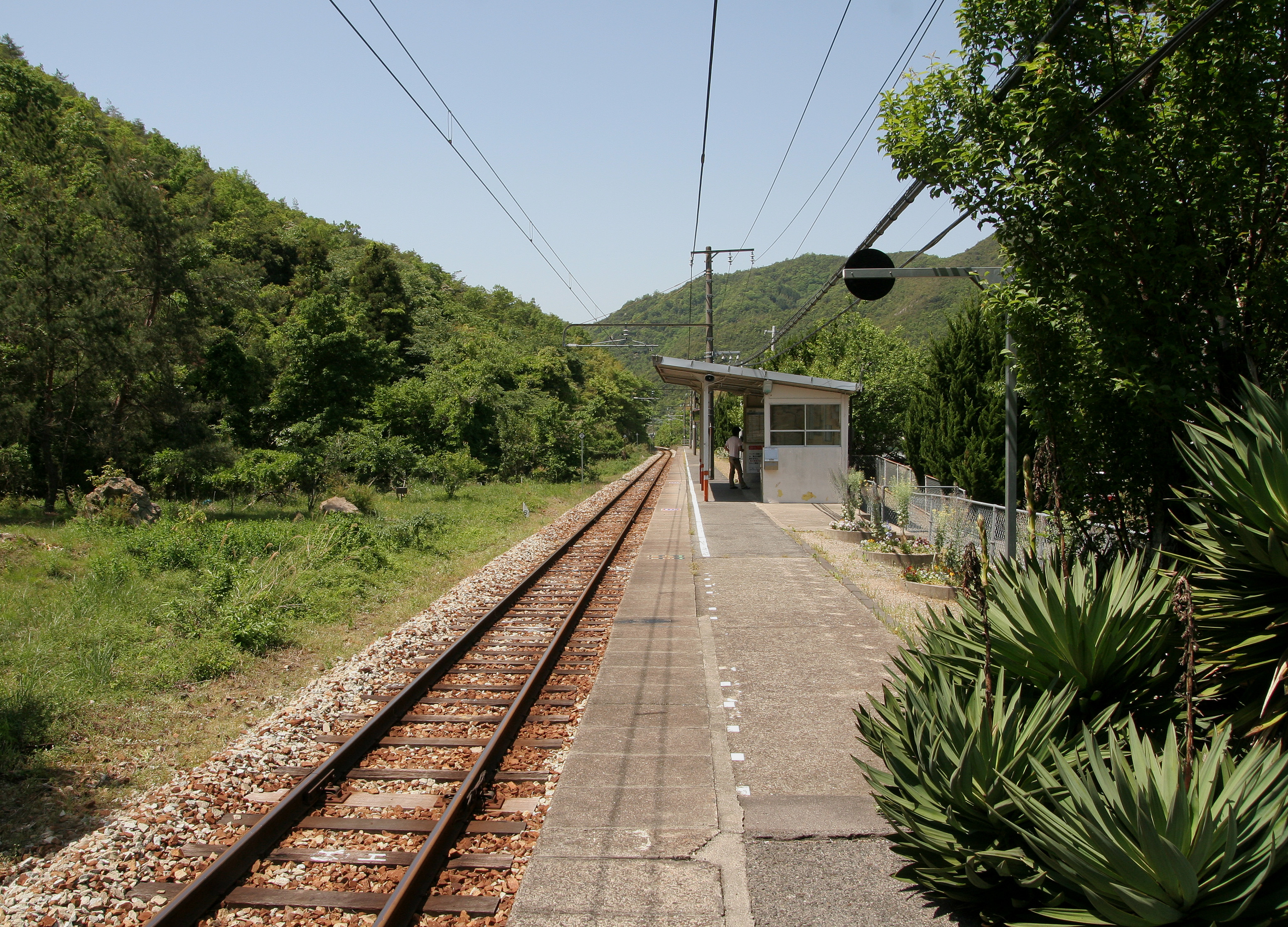
Sōgo Station

Sōgo Station (寒河駅, Sōgo-eki) is a railway station in Bizen, Okayama Prefecture, Japan.

It is a single line train station and is unstaffed. Facilities at the train station include a small car park, public phone and toilets.

Sōgo Station is the final train station in Okayama Prefecture on the way to Hyōgo Prefecture. Sōgo literally means 'cold river'.

== Lines ==
- West Japan Railway Company
  - Akō Line

== Adjacent stations ==
«	Service	»
JR West
Akō Line
Bizen-Fukukawa	-	Hinase
