= Hinase Station =

Railway station in Bizen, Okayama Prefecture, Japan

Hinase Station 日生駅
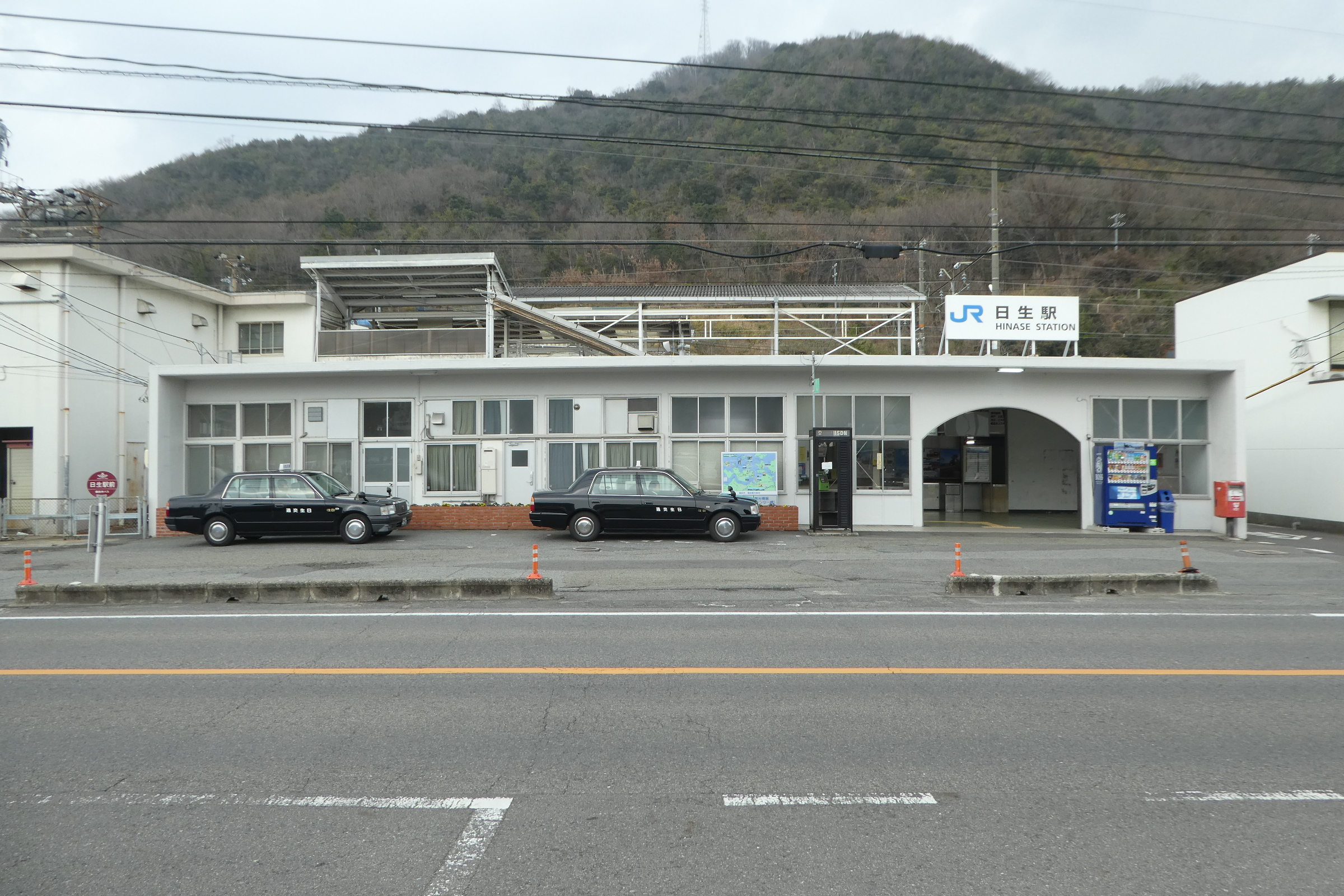
- Hinase Station in March 2018

General information
- Location: Hinase Sōgo 2574, Bizen-shi, Okayama-ken 701-3202; Japan
- Coordinates: 34°44′5.86″N 134°16′36.00″E
- Owner: West Japan Railway Company
- Operator: West Japan Railway Company
- Line: N Akō Line
- Distance: 22.1 km (13.7 miles) from Aioi
- Platforms: 1 side + 1 island platform
- Tracks: 2
- Connections: Bus stop

Other information
- Status: Unstaffed
- Station code: JR-N15
- Website: Official website

History
- Opened: 1 March 1955

Passengers
- FY2019: 315 daily
Location
- Location within Okayama Prefecture Location within Japan

Hinase Station (日生駅, Hinase-eki) is a passenger railway station located in the Hinase neighborhood of city of Bizen, Okayama Prefecture, Japan, operated by the West Japan Railway Company (JR West).

== Lines ==
Hinase Station is served by the JR Akō Line, and is located 22.1 kilometers from the terminus of the line at Aioi and 11.6 kilometers from Banshū-Akō.

== Station layout ==
The station consists of one side platform and one island platform located on an embankment, and connected to the station building by a footbridge. The outbound main line is Platform 1, inbound main line is Platform 2. Platform 3 is the secondary main line for both upper and lower trains.. The station is unattended.

=== Platforms ===
1	■ N Akō Line	for Okayama, Fukuyama and Niimi
2, 3	■ N Akō Line	for Banshū-Akō

== Adjacent stations ==
«	Service	»
JR West Akō Line
Sōgo	-	Iri

== History ==
Hinase Station was opened on 1 March 1955. With the privatization of Japanese National Railways (JNR) on 1 April 1987, the station came under the control of JR West.

== Passenger statistics ==
In fiscal 2019, the station was used by an average of 315 passengers daily

== Surrounding area ==
- Hinase Port
- Kagoura History and Culture Museum

== See also ==
- List of railway stations in Japan
