= Akō Unka ware =

Akō Unka ware (赤穂雲火焼) is a type of Japanese pottery traditionally made in Akō, Hyōgo prefecture.
