= Aioi, Hyōgo =

Aioi 相生市
- City
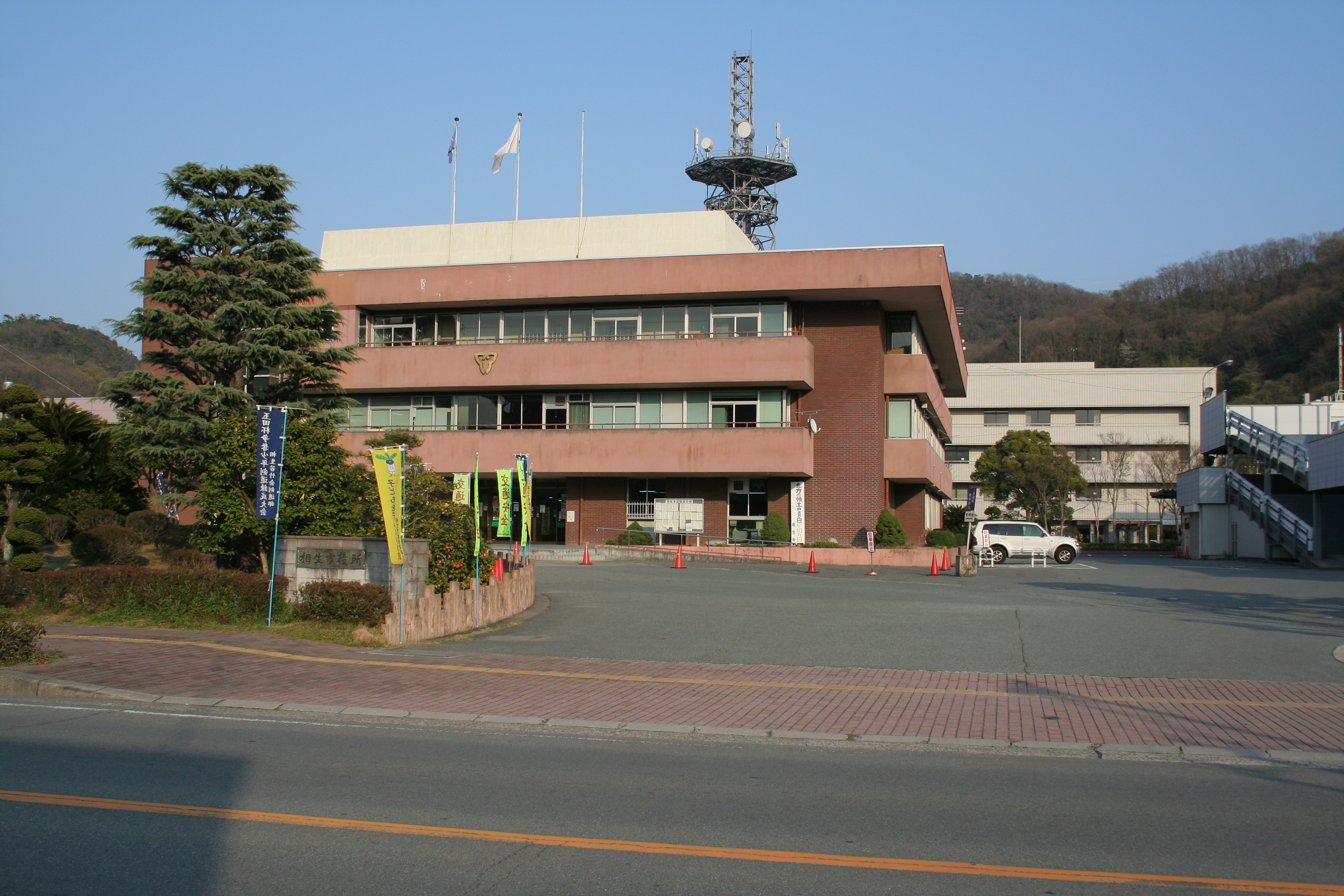
- Aioi City Hall

- Flag Emblem

- Location of Aioi in Hyōgo Prefecture

- Location in Japan
- Coordinates: 34°48′N 134°28′E
- Country: Japan
- Region: Kansai
- Prefecture: Hyōgo

Government
  - Mayor: Yoshiki Taniguchi (since May 2000)

Area
  - Total: 90.40 km^{2} (34.90 sq mi)

Population (May 31, 2022)
  - Total: 28,208
  - Density: 312.0/km^{2} (808.2/sq mi)
- Time zone: UTC+09:00 (JST)
- City hall address: 1-1-3 Asahi, Aioi-shi, Hyōgo-ken 678-8585
- Website: Official website
- Symbols
- Flower: Cosmos
- Tree: Camellia

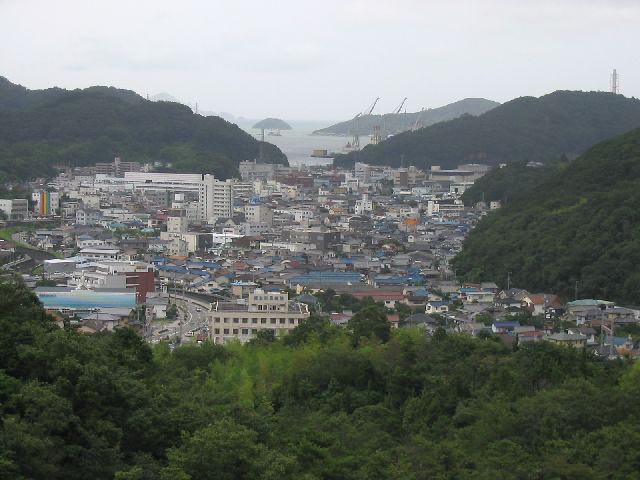
Aioi city

Aioi (相生市, Aioi-shi; Japanese pronunciation: [ä̀í.ó̞í, -ó̞.í.ɕì, -ó̞ì.ɕì]) is a city in Hyōgo Prefecture, Japan. As of 31 May 2022, the city had an estimated population of 28,208 in 13143 households and a population density of 310 persons per km^{2}. The total area of the city is 90.4 square kilometres (34.9 sq mi).

== Geography ==
Aioi is located in southwestern Hyōgo Prefecture extending largely south to north. The city's northern region is mountainous, the southern region faces the Seto Inland Sea.The area around the urban center, with Mt. Minosan in the north, Mt. Tengadai in the east, and Mt. Miya in the west, is a basin surrounded by small mountains.

=== Neighboring municipalities ===
Hyōgo Prefecture

- Akō
- Tatsuno

=== Climate ===
Aioi has a humid subtropical climate (Köppen Cfa) characterized by warm summers and cool winters with light to no snowfall. The average annual temperature in Aioi is 15.0 °C. The average annual rainfall is 1519 mm with September as the wettest month. The temperatures are highest on average in August, at around 26.0 °C, and lowest in January, at around 4.6 °C.

== Demographics ==
Per Japanese census data, the population of Aioi has remained relatively constant over the past 70 years.

Historical population
Year	Pop.	±%
1950	35,894	—
1960	36,521	+1.7%
1970	40,657	+11.3%
1980	41,498	+2.1%
1990	36,871	−11.1%
2000	34,320	−6.9%
2010	31,171	−9.2%

== History ==
The Aioi area was part of ancient Harima Province and was located on the San'yō highway linking western Japan with the Kinai region. The area was the location of a stronghold of the Ebina clan, originally from Sagami Province, who were retainers of the powerful Akamatsu clan. In the Edo period, the area became part of the holdings of Akō Domain. The village of Ō (相生村, Ōmura) was established with the creation of the modern municipalities system on April 1, 1889. It was raised to town status on January 1, 1913, becoming Ō (相生町, Ō-chō). The town merged with the neighboring town of Naba on April 1, 1939, and the reading of the kanji of its name was officially changed to "Aioi" on April 13, 1939. It was raised to city status on October 1, 1942. Aioi merged with the villages of Wakasano and Yano on April 1, 1954.

== Government ==
Aioi has a mayor-council form of government with a directly elected mayor and a unicameral city council of 14 members. Aioi contributes one member to the Hyogo Prefectural Assembly. In terms of national politics, the city is part of Hyōgo 12th district of the lower house of the Diet of Japan.

== Economy ==
Aioi has traditionally been famous for shipbuilding, which, despite many years of decline, still maintains a strong presence through Ishikawajima-Harima Heavy Industries (IHI). The city is increasingly becoming a bedroom community, with 25.0% of those commuting to work going to Tatsuno or Himeji. (2010 National Census).

== Education ==
Aioi has seven public elementary schools and three public middle schools operated by the city government and two public high schools operated by the Hyōgo Prefectural Department of Education. There is also one private high school.

== Transportation ==
=== Railway ===
JR West – San'yō Shinkansen

- Aioi

JR West – San'yō Main Line / Akō Line

- Aioi - Nishi-Aioi

=== Highways ===
- San'yō Expressway
- Harima Expressway
- National Route 2
- National Route 250

== Local attractions ==
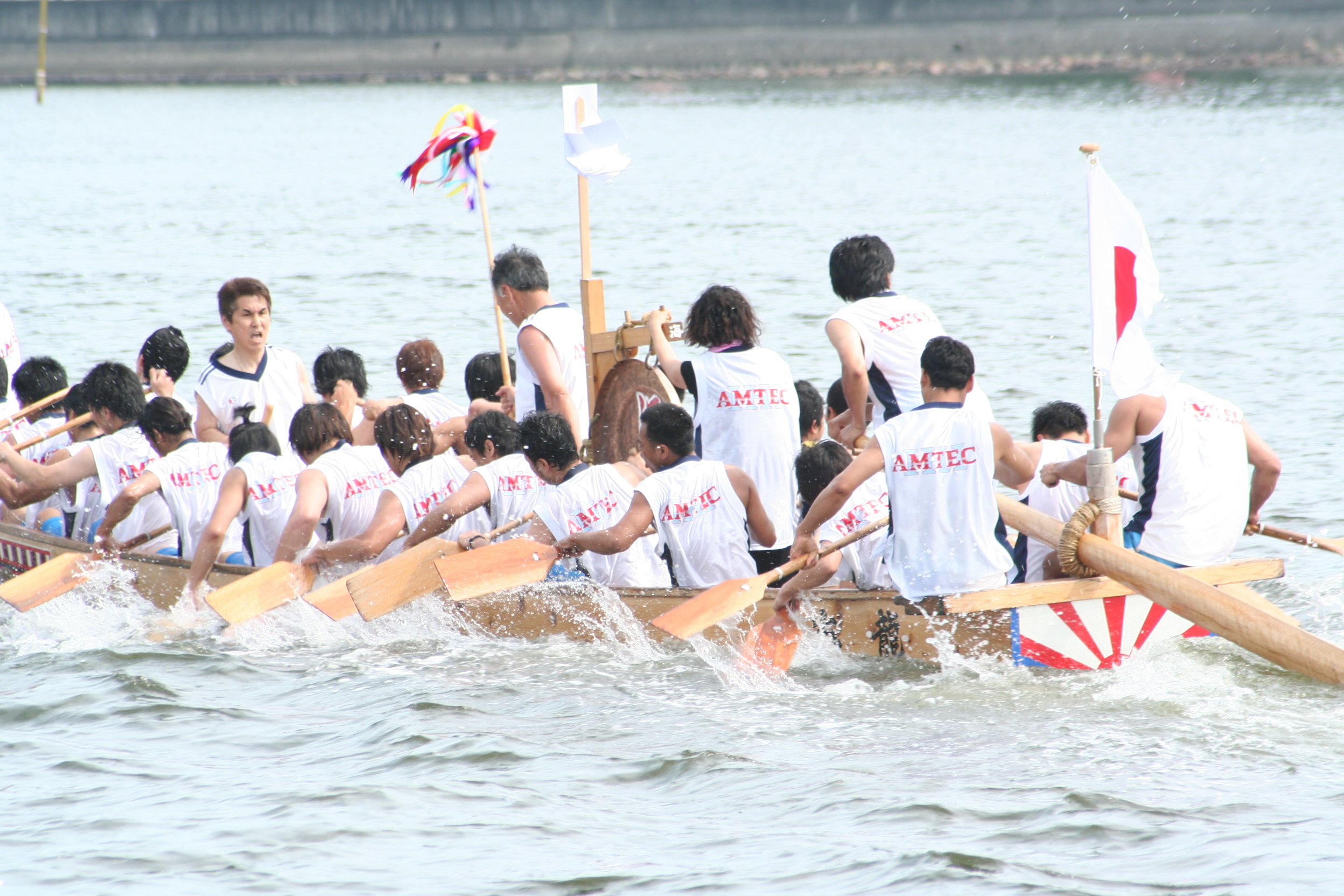
Dragon Boat races in Aioi

- Aioi Peron Festival (相生ペーロン祭), with dragon boat races, which takes place on the last weekend of May each year. In 1655, the dragon boat races were brought from China to Nagasaki. Later in 1922, some Nagasaki IHI workers were transferred to Aioi.
- Kanjōsan Castle ruins, National Historic Site

=== Daikon ===
In November 2005, the city was mentioned in world news reports after a large daikon radish that grew though the pavement was found slashed. According to a city spokesperson, the radish was seen as an inspiration due to "its tenacity and strong will to live." Efforts were undertaken to propagate the radish from a cutting, as well as to harvest the plant's DNA. The tenacious daikon, nicknamed "Daichan," has since been celebrated in a children's book. In 2006, a special firework representing the daikon was set off at the annual firework display preceding the dragon boat races.

== Noted people from Aioi ==
- Ikuo Oyama, politician
- Kirio Urayama, film director
- Tsuyoshi Yamaguchi, politician
- Yoshito Yasuhara, voice actor
