= Risa Shigetomo =

Japanese long-distance runner

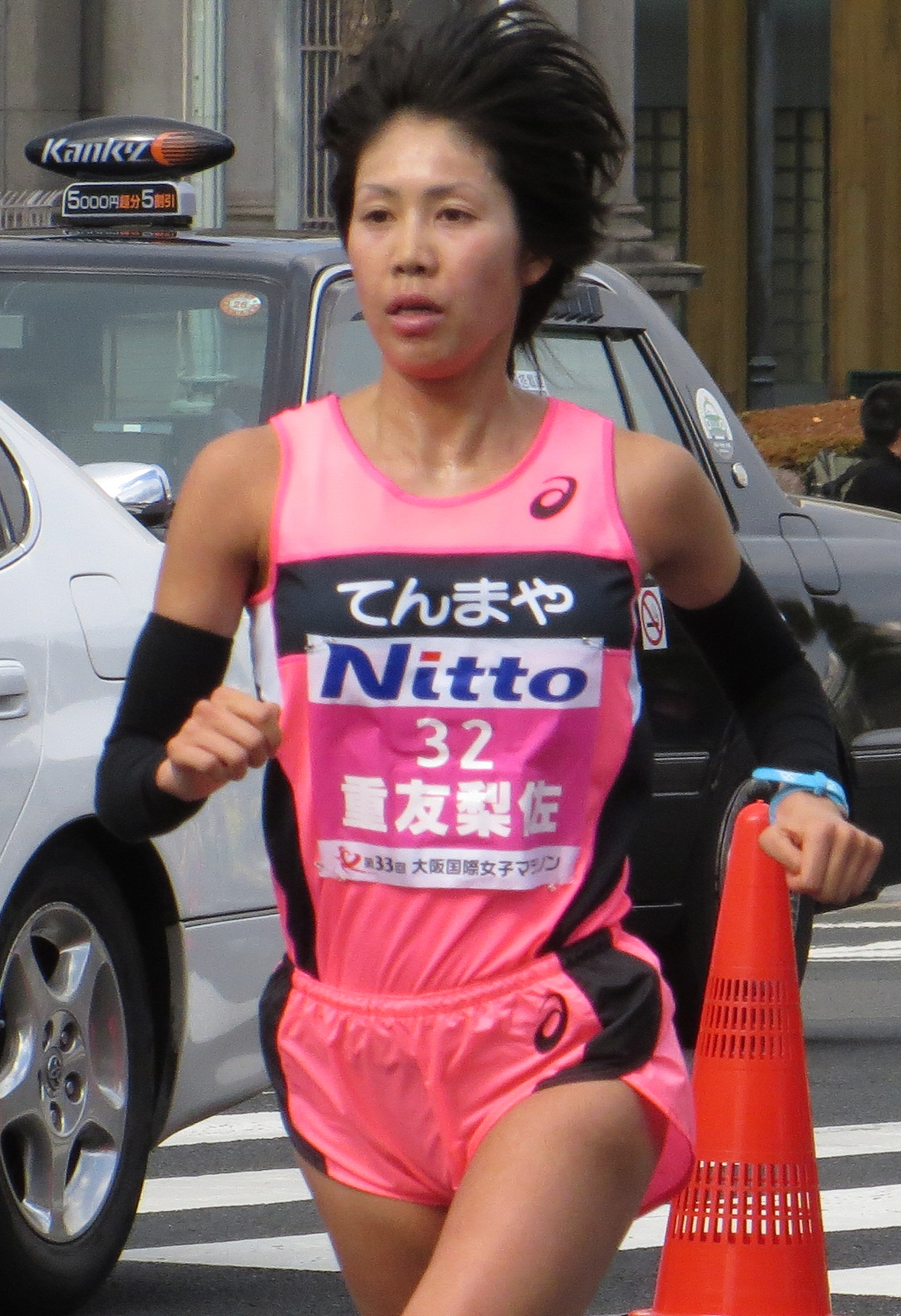

Personal information
- Born: August 29, 1987 (age 38) Bizen, Okayama, Japan
- Height: 1.68 m (5 ft 6 in)
- Weight: 50 kg (110 lb)

Sport
- Country: Japan
- Sport: Athletics
- Event: Marathon

Risa Shigetomo (重友 梨佐, Shigetomo Risa; born 29 August 1987 in Bizen) is a Japanese long-distance runner. She competed in the marathon at the 2012 Summer Olympics, placing 78th with a time of 2:40:06. She finished in 14th place in the marathon at the 2015 World Championship with a time of 2:32:37. Her personal best is 2:23:23, set in Osaka in 2012, while she was winning the 2012 Osaka marathon. She won the Osaka Marathon again in 2017, in a time of 2:24:22. Winning the Osaka Marathon earned her a place on Japan's 2017 World Championship team.
