= Kōken-ji =

Buddhist temple in Okayama Prefecture, Japan

Coordinates: 34°55′08″N 134°15′13″E

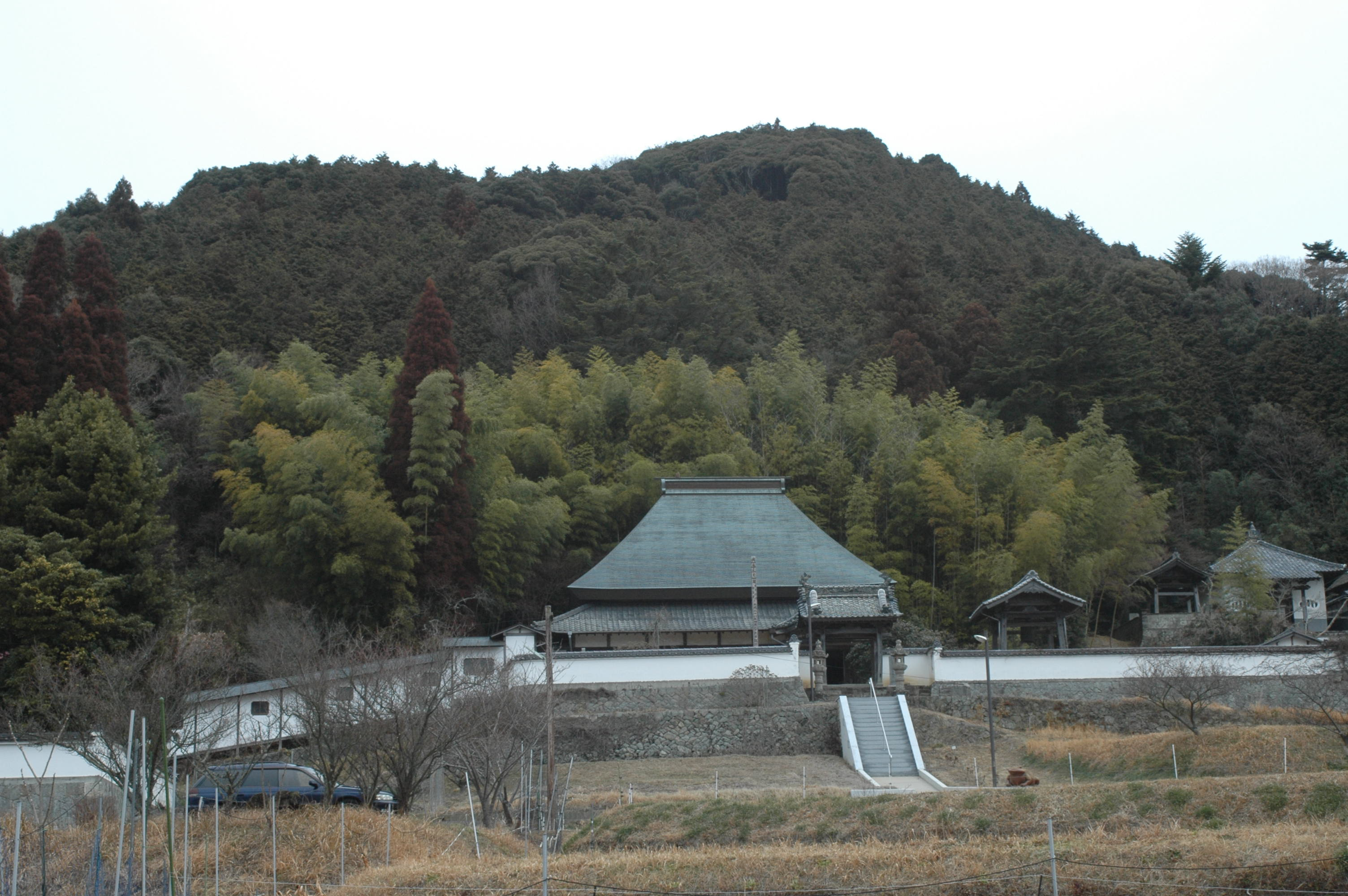
Kōken-ji

Kōken-ji (高顕寺) is a Buddhist temple of the Kōyasan Shingon school located in Bizen, Okayama Prefecture, Japan.

The temple is located atop Mount Enichi. The main deity (or honzon (本尊)) of the temple is Fudō Myōō (不動明王).

The temple was first constructed as Hattō-ji in 728 by the monk Dōkyō at the request of Emperor Shōmu. The temple was renamed to Kōken-ji in 1830.

== Access ==
- JR railway service: From Okayama Station, proceed on JR Sanyo main line to Yoshinaga Station (approx. 35min.). From Yoshinaga Station, proceed by bus or taxi (see below).
- Bizen bus: From Yoshinaga Station, take a bus for Hattoji (approx. 30min.\200). There are no bus services on Sundays and national holidays.
- Taxi: From Yoshinaga Station to Hattoji: approx. 25 mins. \4,500
- By car: Via Sanyo Expressway (exit at Bizen I.C.) => National Route 2 turn right for Shizutani School and Yoshinaga. Follow signs for Hattoji Furusato Village
