= Akō Line =

Railway line in Japan

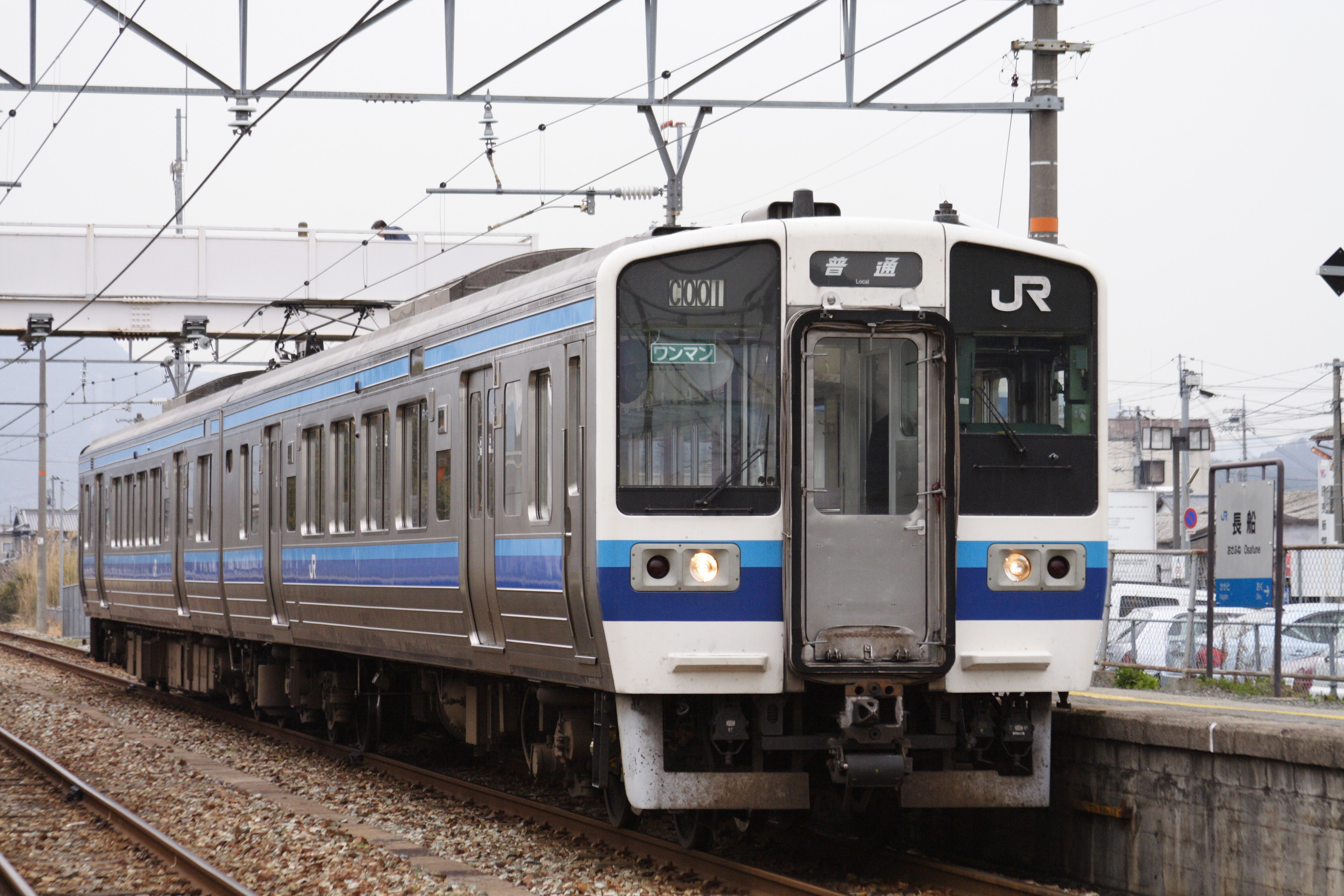
- 213 series EMU on an Akō Line local service at Osafune Station

Overview
- Native name: 赤穂線
- Owner: JR West
- Locale: Hyogo Prefecture and Okayama Prefecture
- Termini: Aioi; Higashi-Okayama
- Stations: 19

Service
- Type: Passenger/freight
- System: Urban Network (Aioi – Banshū-Akō)
- Operator(s): JR West; JR Freight
- Rolling stock: 113 series EMU; 115 series EMU; 117 series EMU; 213 series EMU; 221 series EMU; 223-1000 series EMU; 223-2000 series EMU; 223-6000 series EMU; 225-0 series EMU; 225-100 series EMU

History
- Opened: 1951; 75 years ago

Technical
- Line length: 57.4 km (35.7 mi)
- Track gauge: 1,067 mm (3 ft 6 in)
- Electrification: 1,500 V DC overhead line
- Operating speed: 85 km/h (53 mph)

Akō Line (赤穂線, Akō-sen) is a railway line owned by West Japan Railway Company (JR West) in Japan, operating between Aioi Station in Aioi, Hyōgo and Higashi-Okayama Station in Okayama, Okayama. The Akō Line operates south of and approximately parallel to both the Sanyō Main Line and the San'yō Shinkansen, with all three lines paralleling the coastline of the Seto Inland Sea.

The entire 57.4 km (35.7 mi) line is single track.

== Services ==
The line is operated in two sections:

- Aioi—Banshū-Akō and
- Banshū-Akō—Higashi-Okayama

No trains terminate at either of the official terminal stations. At Aioi all trains operate a through service to/from Himeji on the Sanyo Main Line with many services continuing further on JR West's Kansai region Urban Network through to Osaka, Kyoto, Maibara & Tsuruga.

As of January 2026, the furthest in distance that Ako Line trains operate to/from is Tsuruga, while the longest service in time is the first weekday service departing Banshū-Akō at 05:33 which operates a Rapid service to Maibara arriving at 10:13 with a running time of 4 hours, 40 minutes.

At Higashi-Okayama all trains operate a through service to/from Okayama and beyond on the Sanyo Main Line.

== Stations ==
All trains on the line are Local services, stopping at every station. "Rapid" and "Special Rapid" trains to/from Kyoto and beyond operate as Local trains between Aioi and Banshū-Akō.

Common name	Official line name	No.	Station	Japanese	Distance (km)	Transfers	Location	
Common name	Official line name	No.	Station	Japanese	Distance (km)	Transfers	City	Prefecture
↑Through service as far as Tsuruga on JR West's Urban Network via JR Kōbe Line, JR Kyōto Line, Kosei Line, Biwako Line and Hokuriku Main Line↑
Sanyō Main Line	Sanyō Main Line	JR-A85	Himeji	姫路		Sanyō Shinkansen; JR Kobe Line ( A85 ) Bantan Line; Kishin Line	Himeji	Hyōgo
Sanyō Main Line	Sanyō Main Line		Agaho	英賀保			Himeji	Hyōgo
Sanyō Main Line	Sanyō Main Line		Harima-Katsuhara	はりま勝原			Himeji	Hyōgo
Sanyō Main Line	Sanyō Main Line		Aboshi	網干			Himeji	Hyōgo
Sanyō Main Line	Sanyō Main Line		Tatsuno	竜野			Tatsuno	Hyōgo
Sanyō Main Line	Sanyō Main Line		Aioi	相生	0.0	Sanyō Shinkansen; Sanyō Main Line	Aioi	Hyōgo
Akō Line	Akō Line		Aioi	相生	0.0	Sanyō Shinkansen; Sanyō Main Line	Aioi	Hyōgo
Akō Line	Akō Line		Nishi-Aioi	西相生	3.0		Aioi	Hyōgo
Akō Line	Akō Line		Sakoshi	坂越	7.8		Ako	Hyōgo
Akō Line	Akō Line		Banshū-Akō	播州赤穂	10.5	Akō Line (for Okayama)	Ako	Hyōgo
Akō Line	Akō Line		Banshū-Akō	播州赤穂	10.5	Akō Line (for Himeji)	Ako	Hyōgo
Akō Line	Akō Line		Tenwa	天和	14.5		Ako	Hyōgo
Akō Line	Akō Line		Bizen-Fukukawa	備前福河	16.4		Ako	Hyōgo
Akō Line	Akō Line	JR-N16	Sōgo	寒河	19.6		Bizen	Okayama
Akō Line	Akō Line	JR-N15	Hinase	日生	22.1		Bizen	Okayama
Akō Line	Akō Line	JR-N14	Iri	伊里	27.7		Bizen	Okayama
Akō Line	Akō Line	JR-N13	Bizen-Katakami	備前片上	31.0		Bizen	Okayama
Akō Line	Akō Line	JR-N12	Nishi-Katakami	西片上	32.3		Bizen	Okayama
Akō Line	Akō Line	JR-N11	Inbe	伊部	34.5		Bizen	Okayama
Akō Line	Akō Line	JR-N10	Kagato	香登	38.5		Bizen	Okayama
Akō Line	Akō Line	JR-N09	Osafune	長船	42.3		Setouchi	Okayama
Akō Line	Akō Line	JR-N08	Oku	邑久	45.9		Setouchi	Okayama
Akō Line	Akō Line	JR-N07	Odomi	大富	48.0		Setouchi	Okayama
Akō Line	Akō Line	JR-N06	Saidaiji	西大寺	51.2		Higashi-ku, Okayama	Okayama
Akō Line	Akō Line	JR-N05	Ōdara	大多羅	54.1		Higashi-ku, Okayama	Okayama
Akō Line	Akō Line	JR-N04	Higashi-Okayama	東岡山	57.4	Sanyō Main Line	Naka-ku, Okayama	Okayama
Sanyō Main Line	Sanyō Main Line		Higashi-Okayama	東岡山	57.4	Sanyō Main Line	Naka-ku, Okayama	Okayama
Sanyō Main Line	Sanyō Main Line	JR-N03	Takashima	高島			Naka-ku, Okayama	Okayama
Sanyō Main Line	Sanyō Main Line	JR-N02	Nishigawara	西川原			Naka-ku, Okayama	Okayama
Sanyō Main Line	Sanyō Main Line	JR-N01	Okayama	岡山		Sanyō Shinkansen; Sanyō Main Line; Tsuyama Line; Uno Line ( Seto-Ōhashi Line); Kibi Line (Momotaro Line); Okayama Electric Tramway Higashiyama Main Line	Kita-ku, Okayama	Okayama
↓Through service to/from Sanyō Main Line↓

== History ==
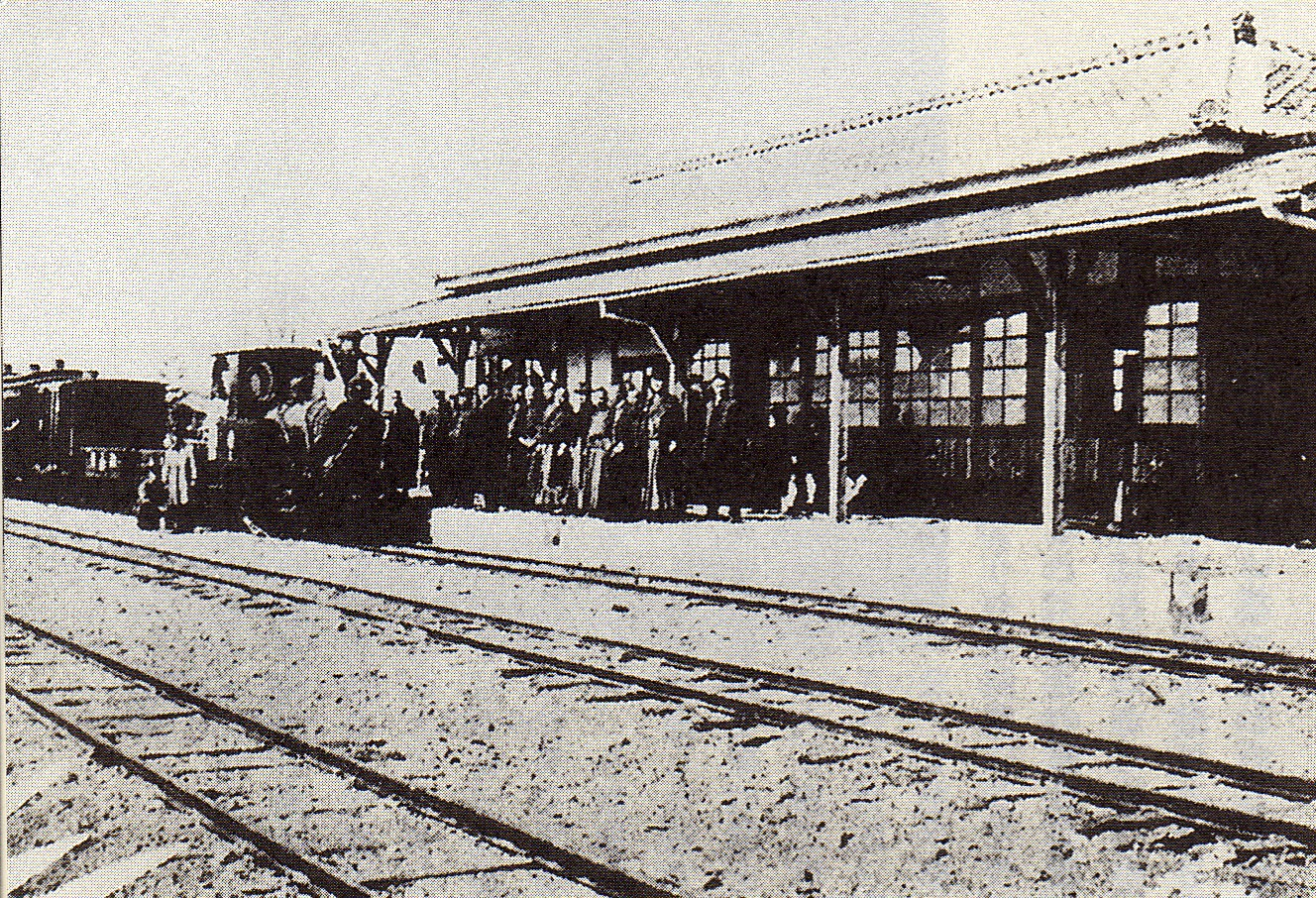
Opening ceremony for the Ako Railway at Banshu-Ako station, 14 April 1921

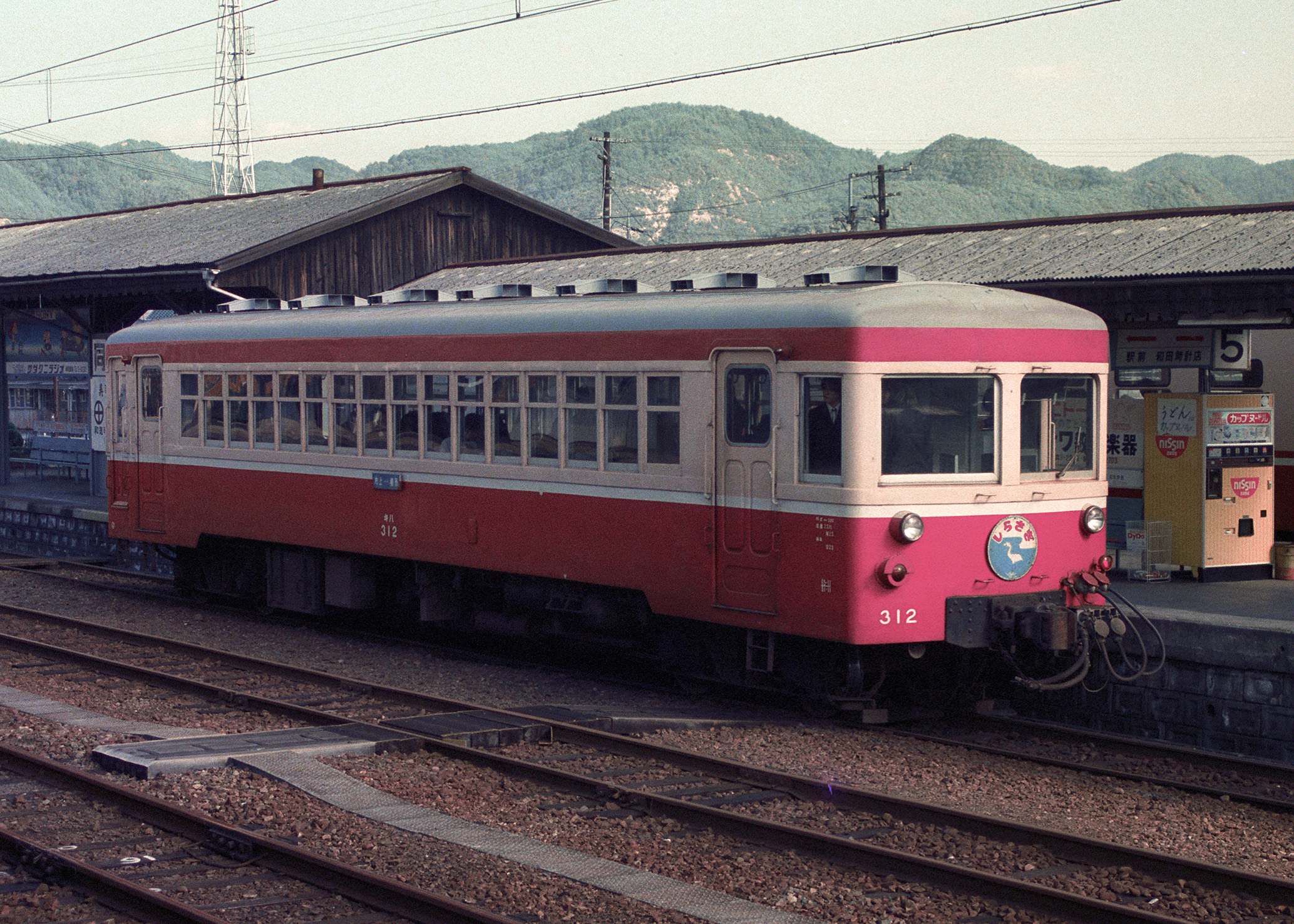
Dowa Mining Co. diesel rail car

The initial section between Aioi and Banshu-Ako opened in 1951, and the line was opened progressively, to Hinase in 1955, Inbe in 1958, and Higashi-Okayama in 1962. The Aioi – Banshu-Ako section was electrified in 1961, and the rest of the line in 1969.

CTC signalling was commissioned between Higashi-Okayama and Banshu-Ako in 1983.

=== Former connecting lines ===
- Banshu-Ako Station: The Ako Railway operated a 13 km (8.1 mi) 762 mm (2 ft 6 in) gauge line to Une on the Sanyo Main Line between 1921 and 1951.
- Nishi-Katakami Station: The Dowa Mining Co. opened a 34 km (21 mi) line to Yanahara, to haul iron sulphide ore, between 1923 and 1931. The line is also connected to Wake station on the Sanyo Main Line. Passenger services commenced in 1931, freight services ceased in 1988 and the line closed in 1991.

== See also ==
Main line alternate routes

- Gotemba Line
- Kure Line
- Ube Line
