= Bizen, Okayama =

Bizen 備前市
- City
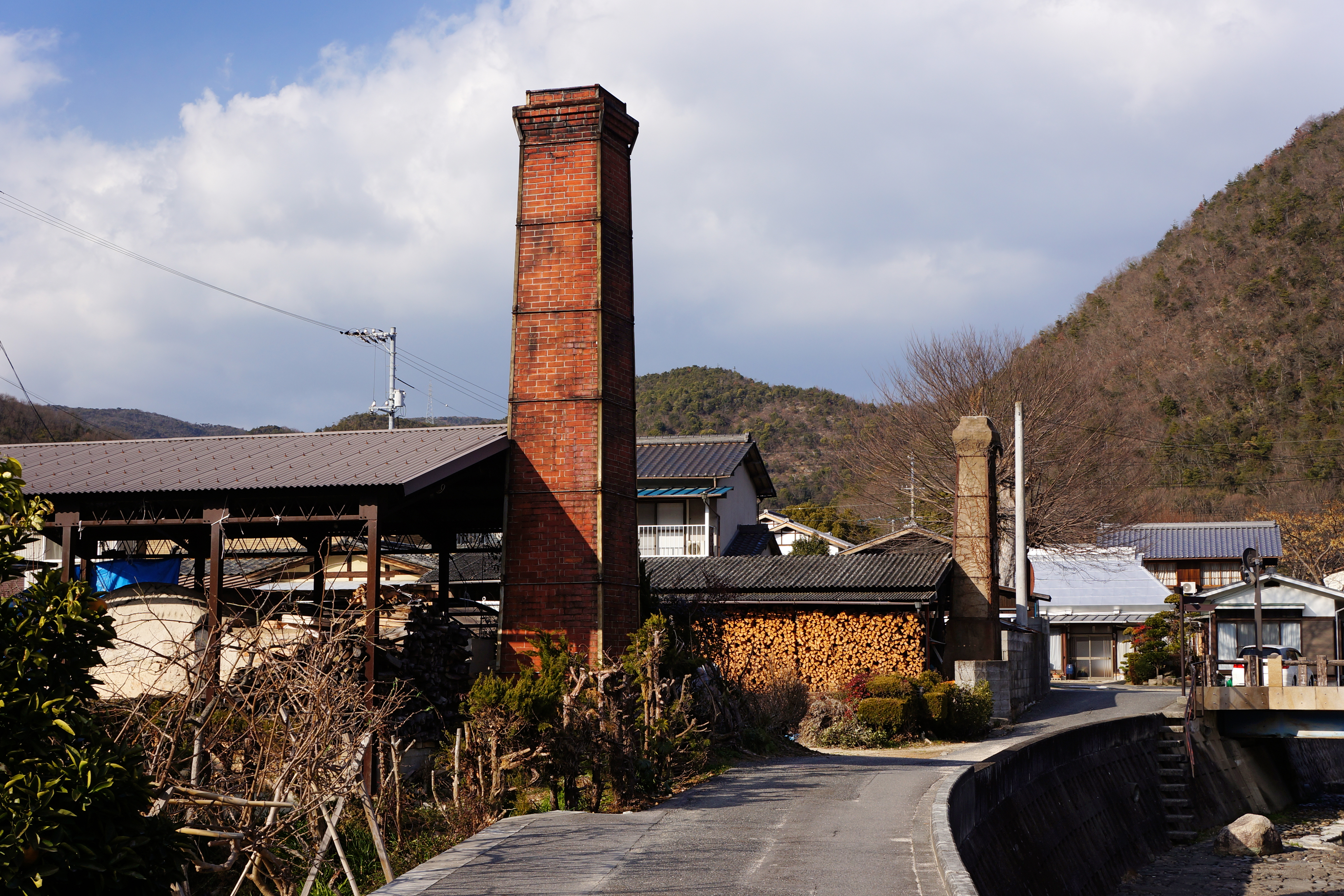
- Bizen City, featuring a kiln chimney. Bizen is famous as the birthplace of Bizen ware ceramics.

- Flag Seal
- Interactive map of Bizen
- Location in Japan
- Coordinates: 34°44′43″N 134°11′20″E
- Country: Japan
- Region: Chūgoku (San'yō)
- Prefecture: Okayama
- First official recorded: 702 AD (estimated)
- Town settled: April 1, 1951
- City settled: April 1, 1971

Government
  - Mayor: Nobuyuki Nagasaki (長崎信行) - from May 2025

Area
  - Total: 258.14 km^{2} (99.67 sq mi)

Population (January 31, 2023)
  - Total: 32,019
  - Density: 124.04/km^{2} (321.26/sq mi)
- Time zone: UTC+09:00 (JST)
- City hall address: 126 Higashikatakami, Bizen-shi, Okayama-ken 705-8602
- Website: Official website
- Symbols
- Fish: Japanese Spanish mackerel
- Flower: Rhododendron
- Tree: Pistacia chinensis

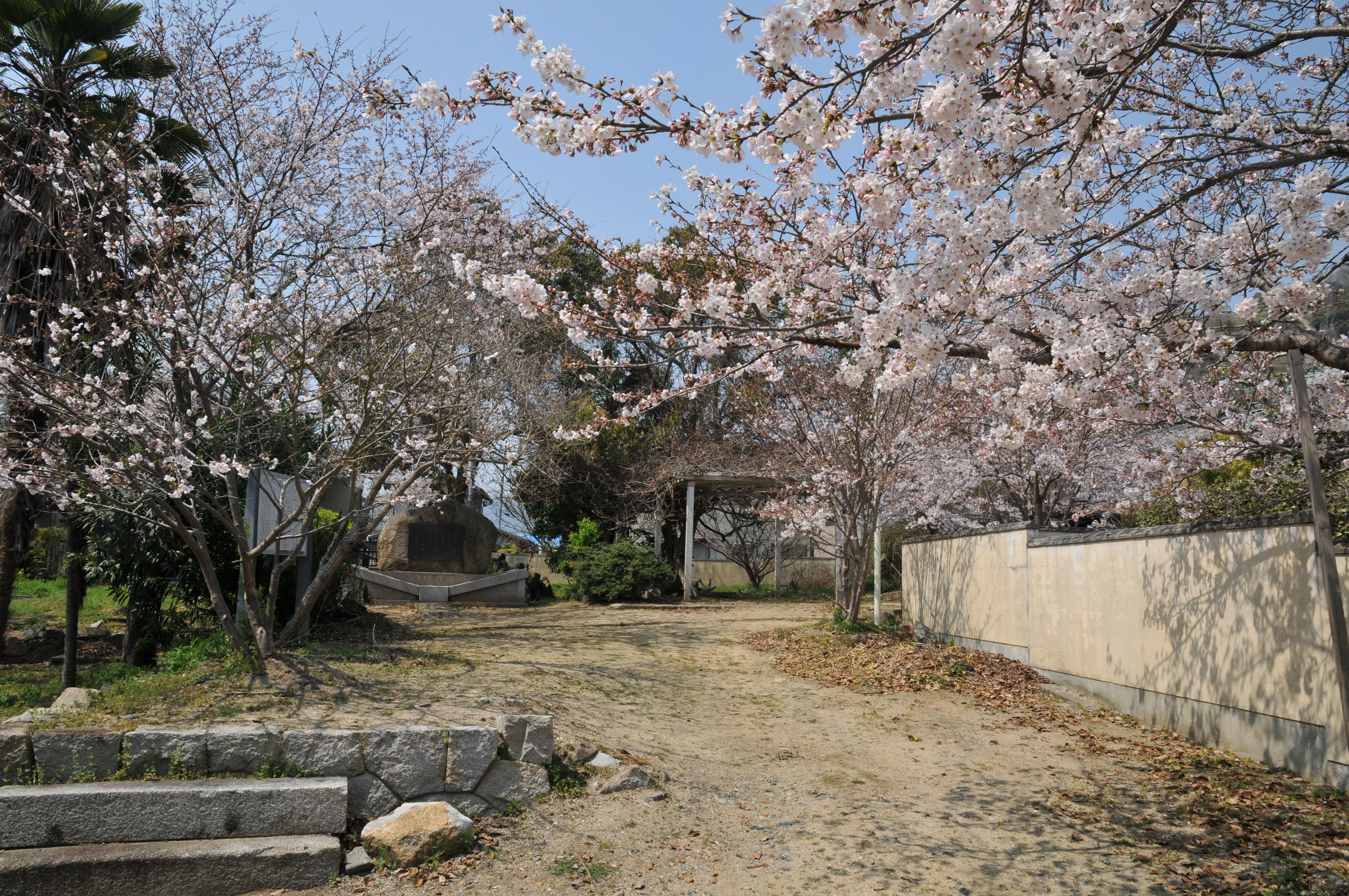
Hakuchō Masamune's birthplace

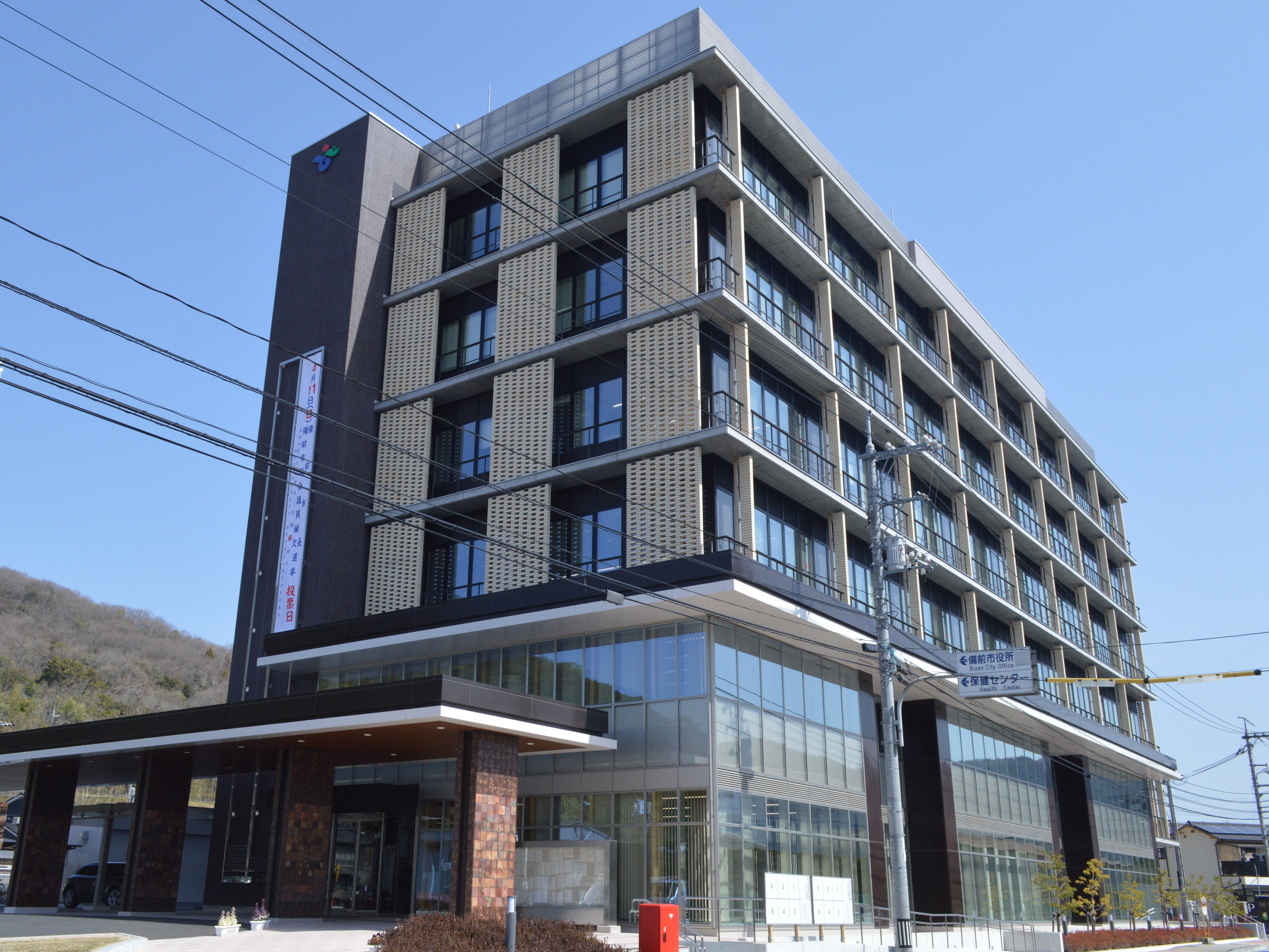
Bizen City Hall

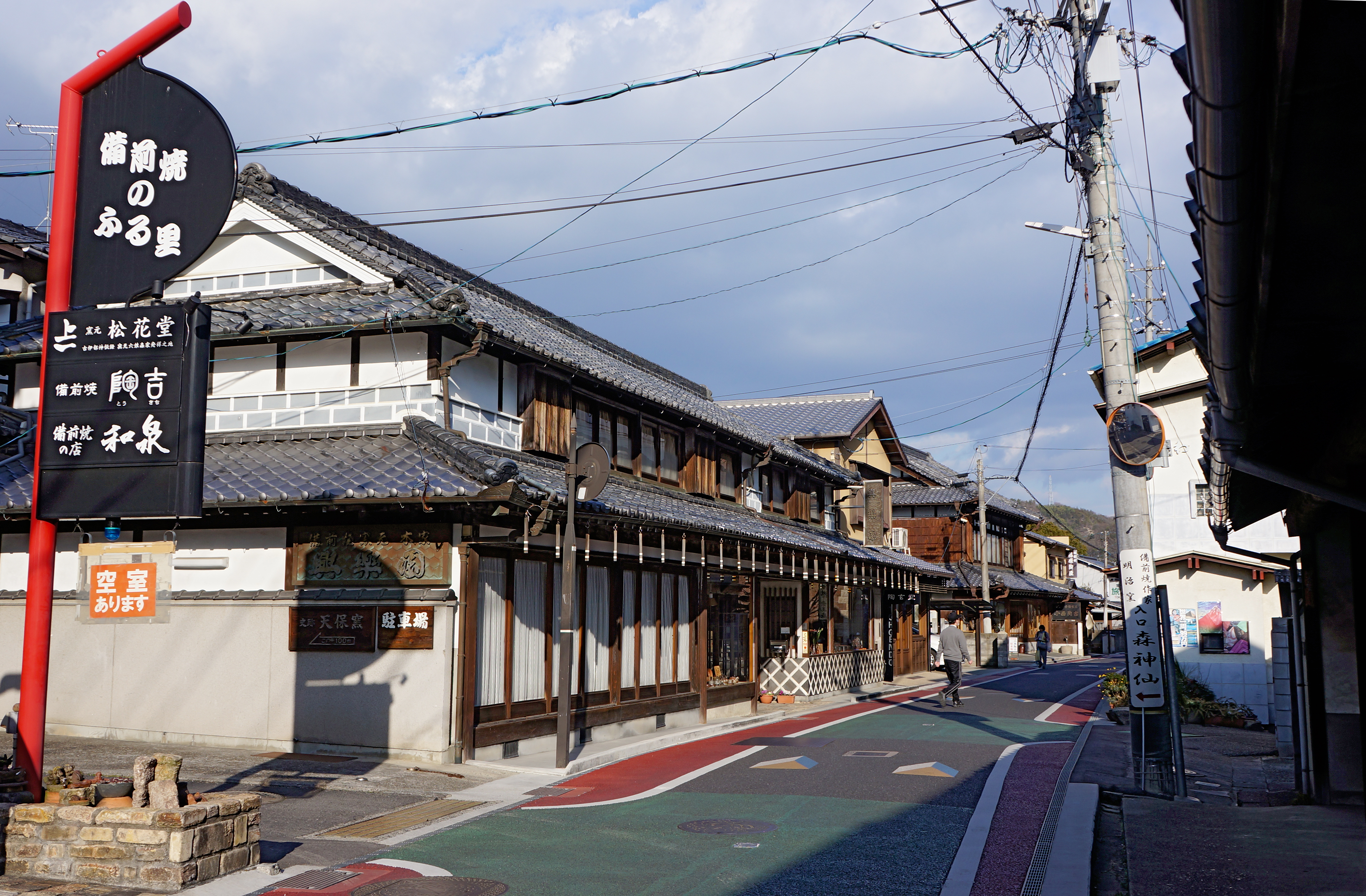
Imbe neighborhood

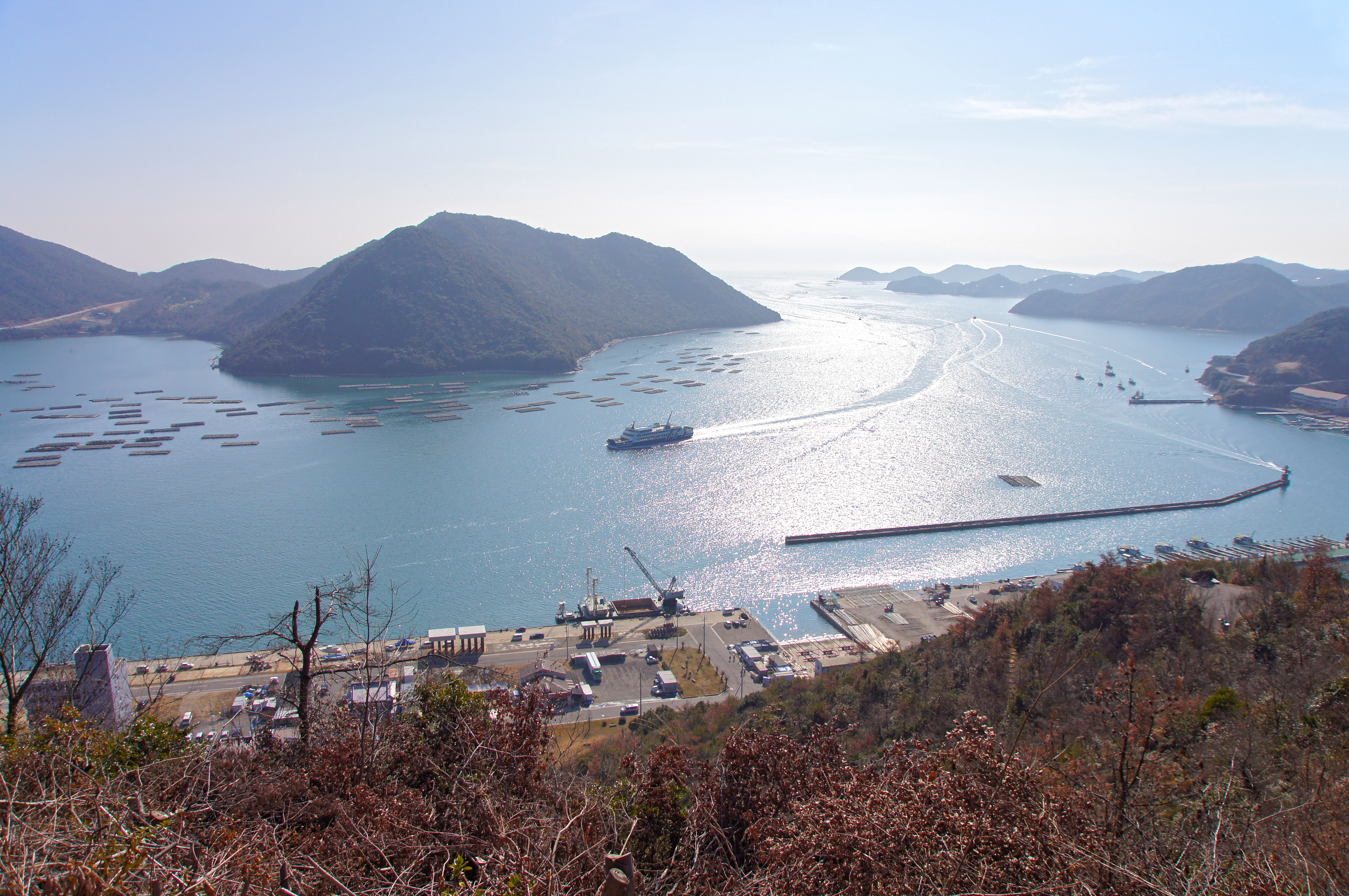
Hinase Bay

Bizen (備前市, Bizen-shi; Japanese pronunciation: [bʲí.(d͡)zè̞ɴ̀, bʲì.(d͡)zé̞ɰ̃̀.ɕì]) is a city located in Okayama Prefecture, Japan. As of 31 January 2023, the city had an estimated population of 32,019 in 15,467 households and a population density of 120 persons per km². The total area of the city is 258.14 square kilometres (99.67 sq mi).

== Geography ==
Bizen is located in southeastern Okayama Prefecture. It faces the Seto Inland Sea to the south, and the coastline is intricate and forms part of the Setonaikai National Park. Katakami Bay extends into the center of the city. The Hinase area in the southeastern part of the country is dotted with islands. Overall, there are few flat areas and hilly areas, and about 80% of the city is forested. The Yoshinaga district in the northeastern part is a plateau area with an altitude of 300 to 500 meters. The southwestern edge of the city is the easternmost edge of the Okayama Plain, and the plain is slightly open, and the Yoshii River flows from the north to the south at the westernmost edge.

=== Adjoining municipalities ===
- Wake

Hyōgo Prefecture

- Ako
- Kamigōri
- Sayō

Okayama Prefecture

- Akaiwa
- Mimasaka
- Okayama
- Setouchi

=== Climate ===
Bizen has a humid subtropical climate (Köppen climate classification Cfa) with very warm summers and cool winters. The average annual temperature in Bizen is 15.9 °C. The average annual rainfall is 1460 mm with September as the wettest month. The temperatures are highest on average in July, at around 27.1 °C, and lowest in January, at around 5.5 °C.

== Demographics ==
Per Japanese census data, the population of Bizen has been declining for then past 60 years.

Historical population
Year	Pop.	±%
1960	50,521	—
1970	50,433	−0.2%
1980	49,306	−2.2%
1990	46,319	−6.1%
2000	42,534	−8.2%
2010	37,830	−11.1%

== History ==
The Bizen area is part of ancient Bizen Province and has been famous for its Bizen ware pottery since the Kamakura period. During the Edo Period, it was part of the holdings of Okayama Domain. Following the Meiji restoration, the village of Imbe was established within Wake District, Okayama with the creation of the modern municipalities system on April 1, 1889. It was raised to town status on April 1, 1912. On April 1, 1951, Imbe merged with the town of Kakakami to form the town of Bizen. On April 1, 1971, Bizen was raised to city status. On March 22, 2005, the towns of Hinase and Yoshinaga (both from Wake District) were merged into Bizen. ².

== Government ==
Bizen has a mayor-council form of government with a directly elected mayor and a unicameral city council of 16 members. Bizen, collectively with the town of Wake, contributes two members to the Okayama Prefectural Assembly. In terms of national politics, the city is part of the Okayama 1st district of the lower house of the Diet of Japan.

== Economy ==
Bizen has long been associated with the pottery industry, and Bizen ware workshops and pottery shops are concentrated in the Imbe district. The square brick chimneys that can be seen in large numbers in the city are from Bizen ware kilns. However, the core industry of the city is refractory bricks, which are made in the Mitsuishi area, as well as activated carbon. Commercial fishing is also important in coastal areas, especially the Hirase area which is noted for using aquaculture for oyster production.

== Education ==
Bizen has ten public elementary schools, five public junior high schools and one public high school operated by the city government, and one public high school operated by the Okayama prefectural Board of Education. The prefecture also operates one special education school for the disabled.

== Transportation ==
=== Railway ===
JR West (JR West) - San'yō Main Line

- Yoshinaga - Mitsuishi

JR West (JR West) - Akō Line

- Hinase - Iri - Bizen-Katakami - Nishi-Katakami - Imbe -Kagato

=== Highways ===
- San'yō Expressway
- National Route 2
- National Route 250
- National Route 374
- National Route 484

== Sister cities ==
Clare and Gilbert Valleys Council, South Australia, Australia since January 1990

== Local attractions ==
- Bizen pottery kiln ruins, National Historic Site
- Bizen City Museum of Art
- Hakuchō Masamune's birthplace, which is now a museum.
- Kōken-ji
- former Shizutani School, a Special National Historic Site
- Tsuruyama Maruyama Kofun, National Historic Site

== Notable people from Bizen ==
- Masamune Atsuo, researcher of Japanese literature and a poet
- Genkei Masamune, botanist
- Hakuchō Masamune, critic, novelist, and dramatist
- Risa Shigetomo, long-distance runner
- Kaneshige Toyo, potter
- Yoshinobu Yamamoto, professional baseball pitcher for the Los Angeles Dodgers of MLB
