= Banshū-Akō Station =

Railway station in Akō, Hyōgo Prefecture, Japan

Banshū-Akō Station 播州赤穂駅
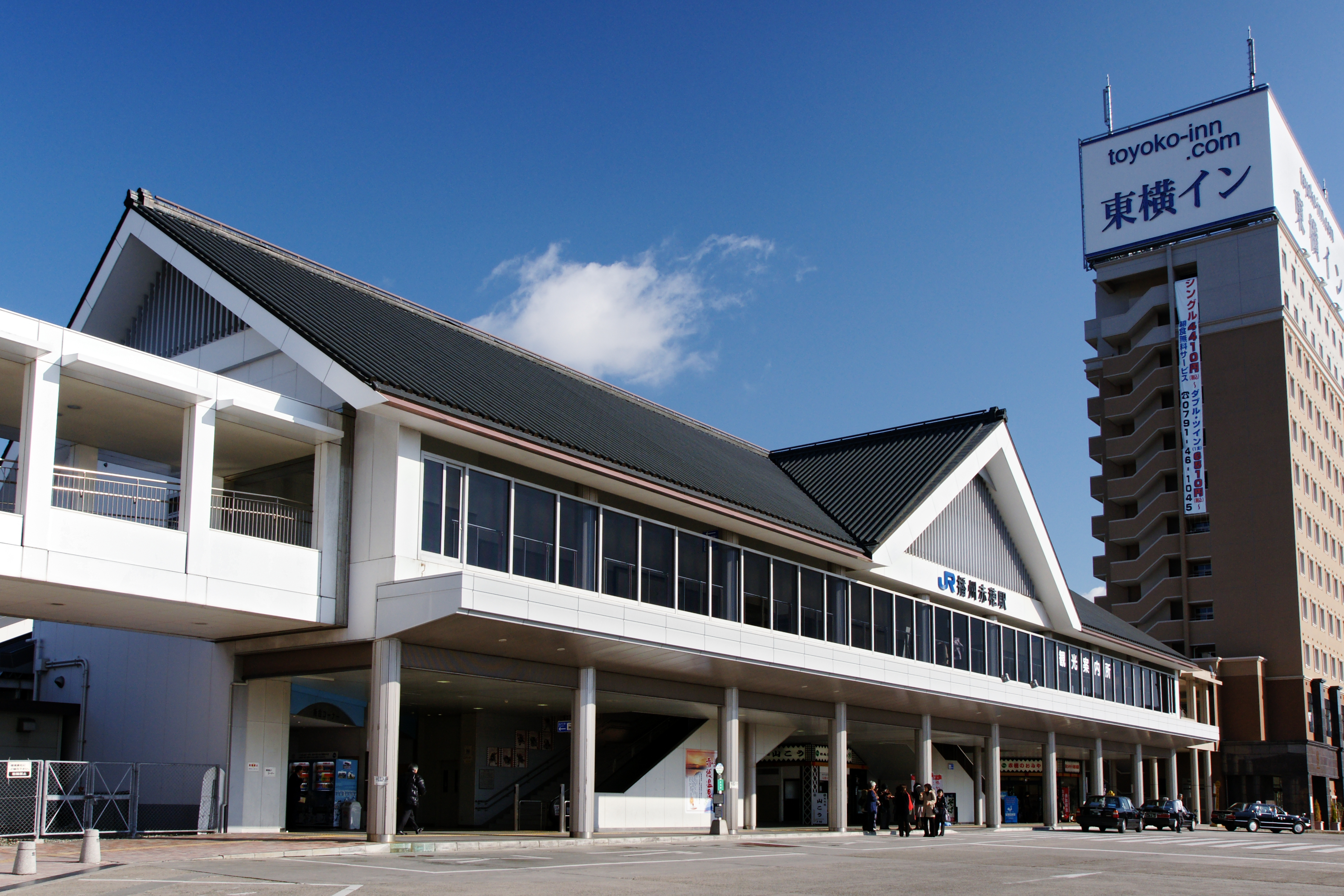
- Banshū-Akō Station

General information
- Location: 328 Kariya, Akō-shi, Hyōgo-ken 678-0239; Japan
- Coordinates: 34°45′23″N 134°23′36″E
- Owner: West Japan Railway Company
- Operator: West Japan Railway Company
- Line: Akō Line
- Distance: 10.5 km (6.5 miles) from Aioi
- Platforms: 1 side + 1 island platform
- Connections: Bus stop

Other information
- Status: Staffed (Midori no Madoguchi)
- Website: Official website

History
- Opened: 12 December 1951

Passengers
- FY2019: 4080 daily
Location
- Location within Hyōgo Prefecture Location within Japan

Banshū-Akō Station (播州赤穂駅, Banshū-Akō-eki) is a junction passenger railway station located in the city of Akō, Hyōgo Prefecture, Japan, operated by the West Japan Railway Company (JR West). The prefix Banshū, indicating the station's location in the old Harima province, was given to distinguish the station from Akaho Station (赤穂駅, Akaho-eki) on the Iida Line in Nagano Prefecture (now Komagane Station), which, although pronounced differently, use the same kanji characters as Akō.

== Lines ==
Banshū-Akō Station is a terminus of the Akō Line, forming the western terminus for trains from Himeji and JR Kobe Line, and the eastern terminus for trains bound for Okayama Station. It is located 10.5 kilometers from Aioi, 31.2 kilometers from Himeji and 119.1 kilometers from Osaka.

== Station layout ==
The station consists of a ground-level side platform and a ground-level island platform connected by an elevated station building. The station has a Midori no Madoguchi staffed ticket office.

=== Platforms ===
1	■ Akō Line, Sanyō Main Line	starting for Aioi and Himeji (special rapid services mainly use)
2	■ Akō Line	starting for Hinase and Okayama
3	■ Akō Line, Sanyō Main Line	starting for Aioi and Himeji
3	■ Akō Line	one train starting for Hinase and Okayama in the morning

== Adjacent stations ==
«	Service	»
JR West
Akō Line
Sakoshi	-	Terminus
Akō Line
Terminus	-	Tenwa

== History ==
Banshū-Akō Station was opened on December 12, 1951. With the privatization of the Japan National Railways (JNR) on April 1, 1987, the station came under the aegis of the West Japan Railway Company.

== Passenger statistics ==
In fiscal 2019, the station was used by an average of 4080 passengers daily

== Surrounding area ==
- Akō City Hall
- Akō Castle Ruins
- Akō City Museum of History
- Akō City Folk Museum
- Japan National Route 250

== See also ==
- List of railway stations in Japan
