= Aioi Station (Hyōgo) =

Railway station in Aioi, Hyōgo Prefecture, Japan

Aioi Station 相生駅
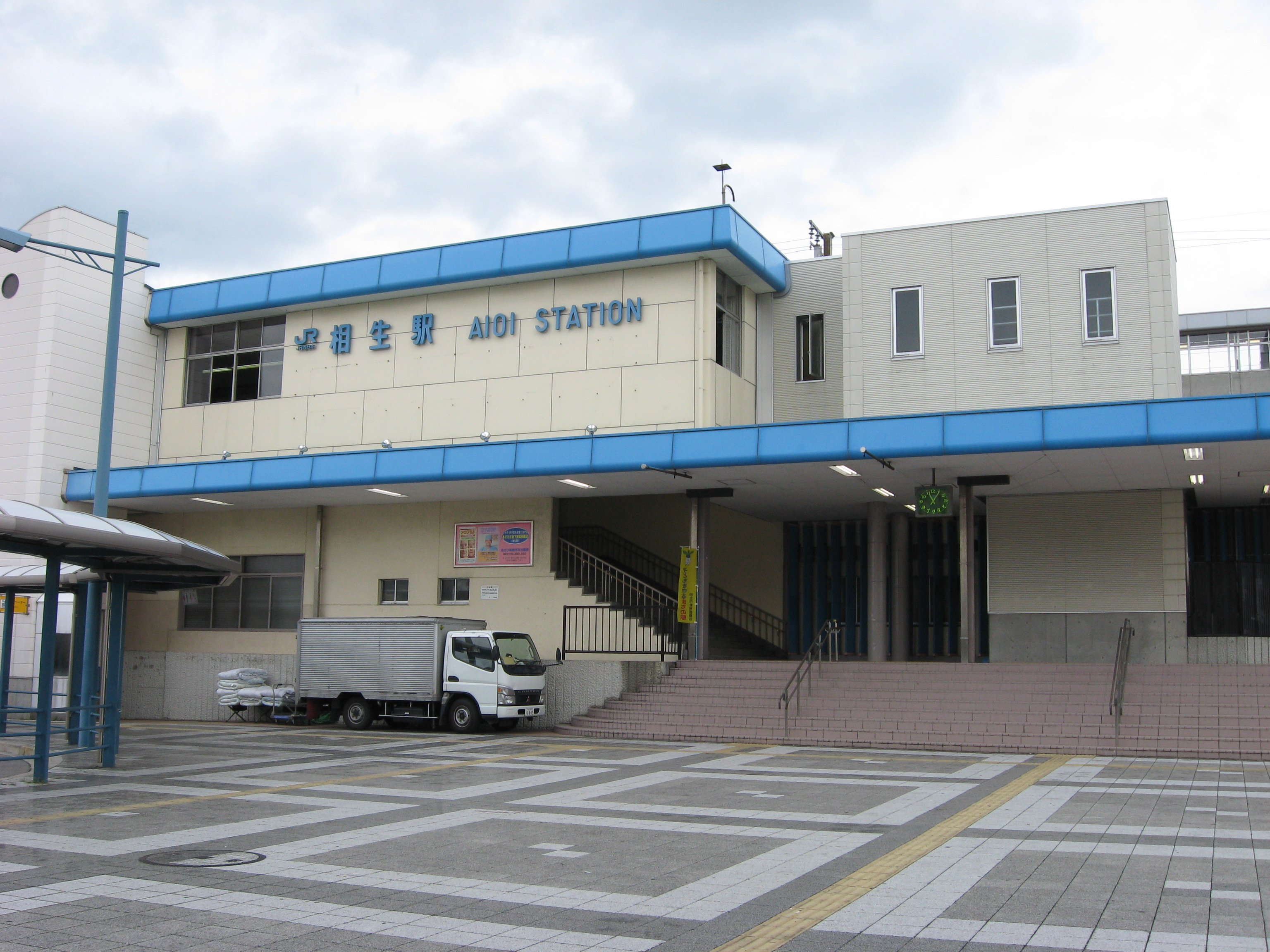
- Aioi Station, August 2008

General information
- Location: 1-10 Hongo-cho, Aioi City, Hyōgo Prefecture 678-0006; Japan
- Coordinates: 34.817938°N 134.473915°E
- Owner: JR West
- Operator: JR West
- Lines: San'yō Shinkansen; A San'yō Line; A Akō Line
- Distance: 112.2 km (69.7 miles) from Shin-Osaka
- Platforms: 3 side + 1 island platform
- Tracks: 5 (2 Shinkansen)
- Connections: Bus stop

Construction
- Structure type: Elevated (Shinkansen); At grade (conventional)

Other information
- Status: Staffed (Midori no Madoguchi)
- Website: Official website

History
- Opened: 10 July 1890; 136 years ago
- Former names: Naba (to 1942)

Passengers
- FY2019: 4355 daily

Services
Preceding station	JR West	Following station
Okayama towards Hakata or Hakataminami	San'yō Shinkansen Kodama	Himeji towards Shin-Ōsaka
Location
- Location within Hyōgo Prefecture Location within Kansai region Location within Japan

Aioi Station (相生駅, Aioi-eki) is a junction passenger railway station in Aioi, Hyōgo Prefecture, Japan, operated by the West Japan Railway Company (JR West).

== Lines ==
Aioi Station is served by the Sanyō Shinkansen, and is located 112.4 kilometers from the terminus of the line at Shin-Osaka and 665.0 kilometers from Tokyo. It is also served by the Sanyō Main Line and is 75.5 kilometers from Kōbe and 108.6 kilometers from Osaka. It is also a terminus of the 57.4 kilometer Akō Line to Higashi-Okayama.

== Station layout ==
Aioi Station has a ground level side platform and a ground-level island platform for normal services, connected by an elevated station building. The Shinkansen portion of the station as two elevated opposed side platforms. The ticket barrier is on the second floor, as are the two exit (South and North). The Sanyo Main Line tracks are on first floor, the Shinkansen tracks are on third floor.

=== Shinkansen ===
11	■ San'yō Shinkansen	for Okayama, Hiroshima, Hakata and Kagoshima-Chūō
12	■ San'yō Shinkansen	for Shin-Osaka and Tokyo

=== Conventional Line ===
1	■ San'yō Main Line, Ako Line	for Kamigori and Okayama
2	■ San'yō Main Line, Ako Line	for Banshu-Ako and Himeji, Sannomiya
3	■ San'yō Main Line	for Himeji and Sannomiya or Kamigori and Okayama

== Adjacent stations ==
«	Service	»
JR West
San'yō Main Line
Himeji	Limited Express Super Hakuto	Kamigori
Tatsuno	Special Rapid	Une
Terminus	Local (Rapid service)	Une
Akō Line
Tatsuno	Special Rapid	Nishi-Aioi
Tatsuno	Local	Nishi-Aioi

== History ==
Aioi Station was opened on 10 July 1890 as Naba Station (那波駅). It was renamed 1 October 1942. With the privatization of the Japan National Railways (JNR) on 1 April 1987, the station came under the aegis of the West Japan Railway Company.

=== Accidents ===
On 28 October 2008 at 14:42, a person was killed at the station after climbing down from the platform onto the down shinkansen track. The person was hit by the non-stop Nozomi 25 service.

== Passenger statistics ==
In fiscal 2019, the station was used by an average of 4,355 passengers daily.

== Surrounding area ==
- Aioi Municipal Hospital
- Japan National Route 250

== See also ==
- List of railway stations in Japan
