= Japan National Route 250 =

National highway in Japan

National Route 250
- 国道250号
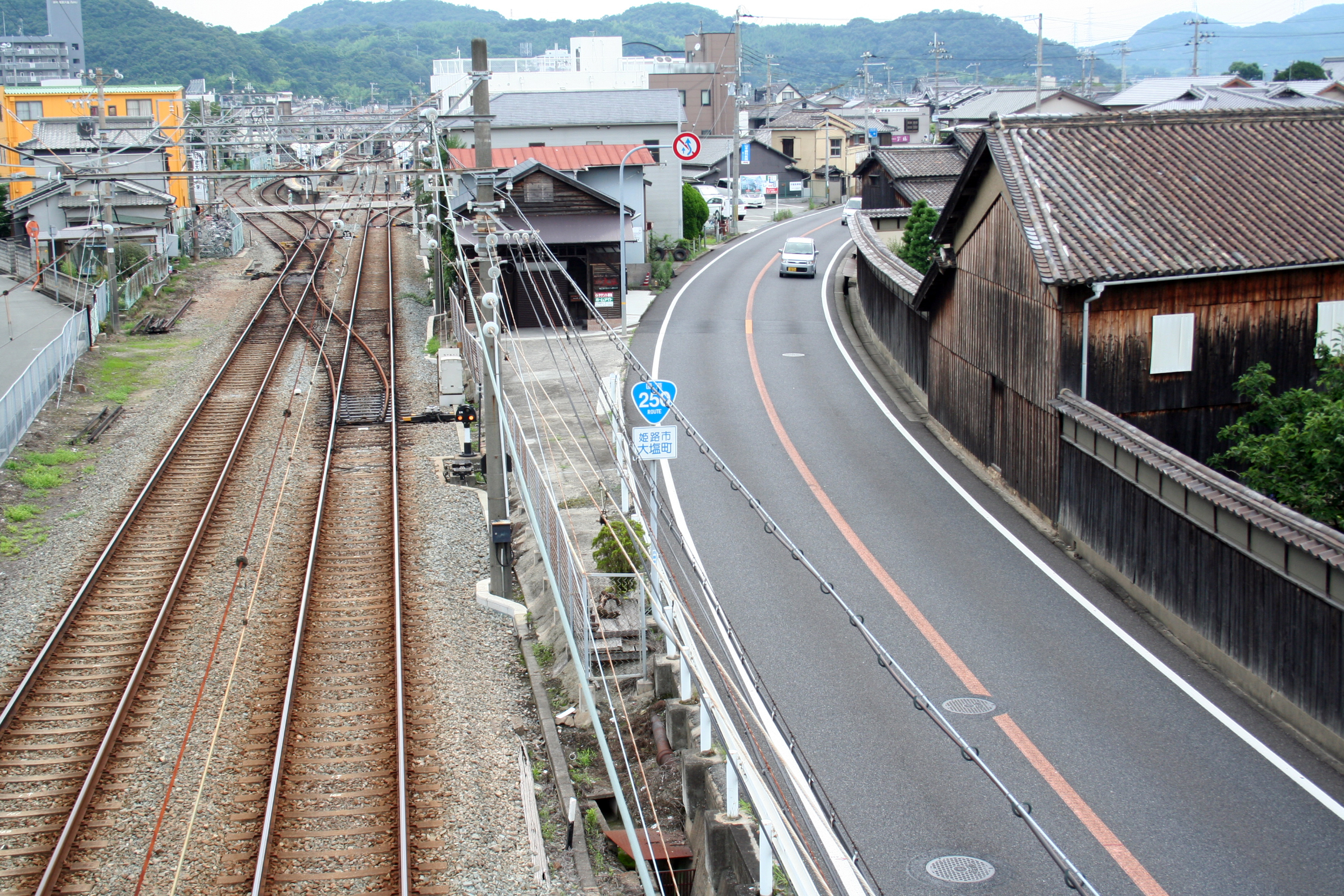

Route information
- Length: 146.3 km (90.9 mi)
- Existed: 10 July 1956–present

Major junctions
- West end: National Route 30 / National Route 53 in Okayama
- East end: National Route 2 in Nagata-ku, Kobe

Location
- Country: Japan

Highway system
- National highways of Japan; Expressways of Japan
| ← National Route 249 | → National Route 251 |

National Route 250 is a national highway of Japan connecting Nagata-ku, Kobe and Okayama in Japan, with a total length of 146.3 km (90.91 mi).
