= Nishigawara Station =

Railway station in Okayama, Japan

Nishigawara Station 西川原駅
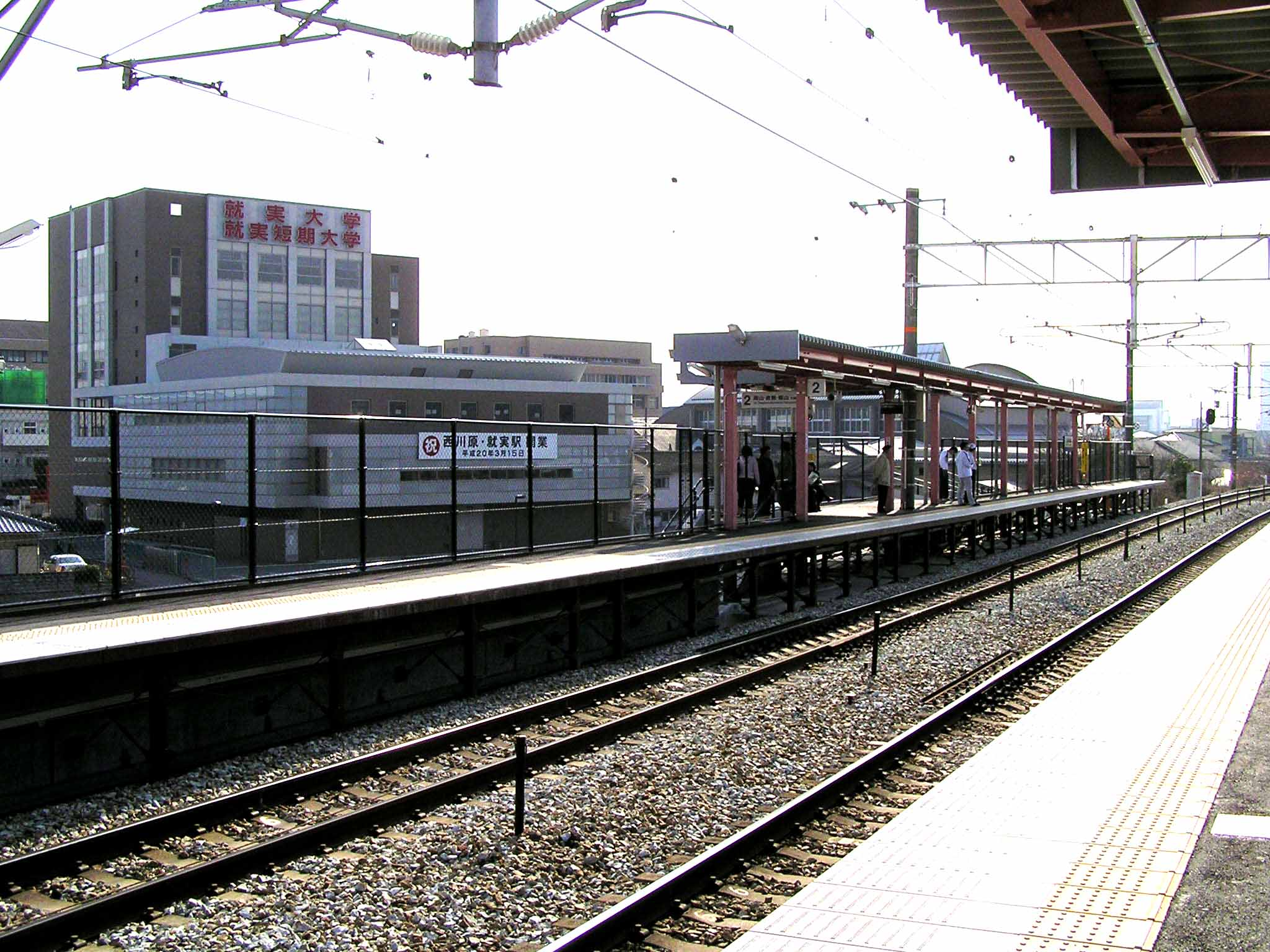
- Nishigawara Station Platform in March 2008

General information
- Location: 203-17 Nishigawara, Naka-ku, Okayama-shi, Okayama-ken 703-8258; Japan
- Coordinates: 34°40′44.25″N 133°56′15.80″E
- Operator: JR West
- Lines: S San'yō Line; N Akō Line
- Distance: 140.8 km (87.5 mi) from Kōbe
- Platforms: 2 side platforms
- Tracks: 2

Construction
- Structure type: Elevated

Other information
- Status: Untaffed
- Station code: JR-S02; JR-N02
- Website: Official website

History
- Opened: 15 March 2008

Passengers
- FY2019: 3873

Services
Preceding station	JR West	Following station
Takashima towards Okayama	Akō Line Local	Okayama towards Aioi
Takashima towards Okayama	San'yō Line Local	Okayama towards Mitsuishi
Location
- Location within Okayama Prefecture Location within Japan

Nishigawara Station (西川原駅, Nishigawara-eki) is a passenger railway station located in Naka-ku, in the city of Okayama, Okayama Prefecture, Japan. It is operated by West Japan Railway Company (JR West). Although the official name of the station is Nishigawara, signage at the station shows the name Nishigawara Shūjitsu (西川原・就実) to mention the nearby Shujitsu University.

== Lines ==
Nishigawara Station is served by the San'yō Main Line and is 140.8 km from the starting of the Sanyo Main Line at Kōbe Station. It is also served by trains of the Akō Line, which continue past the nominal terminus of that line at Higashi-Okayama to terminate at Okayama Station via the San'yō Main Line tracks.

== Layout ==
The station has two elevated opposed side platforms, with the station facilities underneath the tracks. The station is unattended.

=== Platforms ===
1	■ S San'yō Main Line	for Wake and Himeji
1	■ N Akō Line	for Saidaiji and Banshū-Akō
2	■ S San'yō Main Line	for Okayama and Mihara
2	■ N Akō Line	for Okayama and Mihara

== History ==
Nishigawara station opened on 15 March 2008.

== Passenger statistics ==
In fiscal 2019, the station was used by an average of 3873 passengers daily

== Surrounding area ==
- Shujitsu University/Shujitsu Junior College
- Okayama Prefectural Okayama Sozan Junior and Senior High School
- Okayama Municipal Uno Elementary School
- Okayama City Naka Ward Office

== See also ==
- List of railway stations in Japan
