= Yoshinaga =

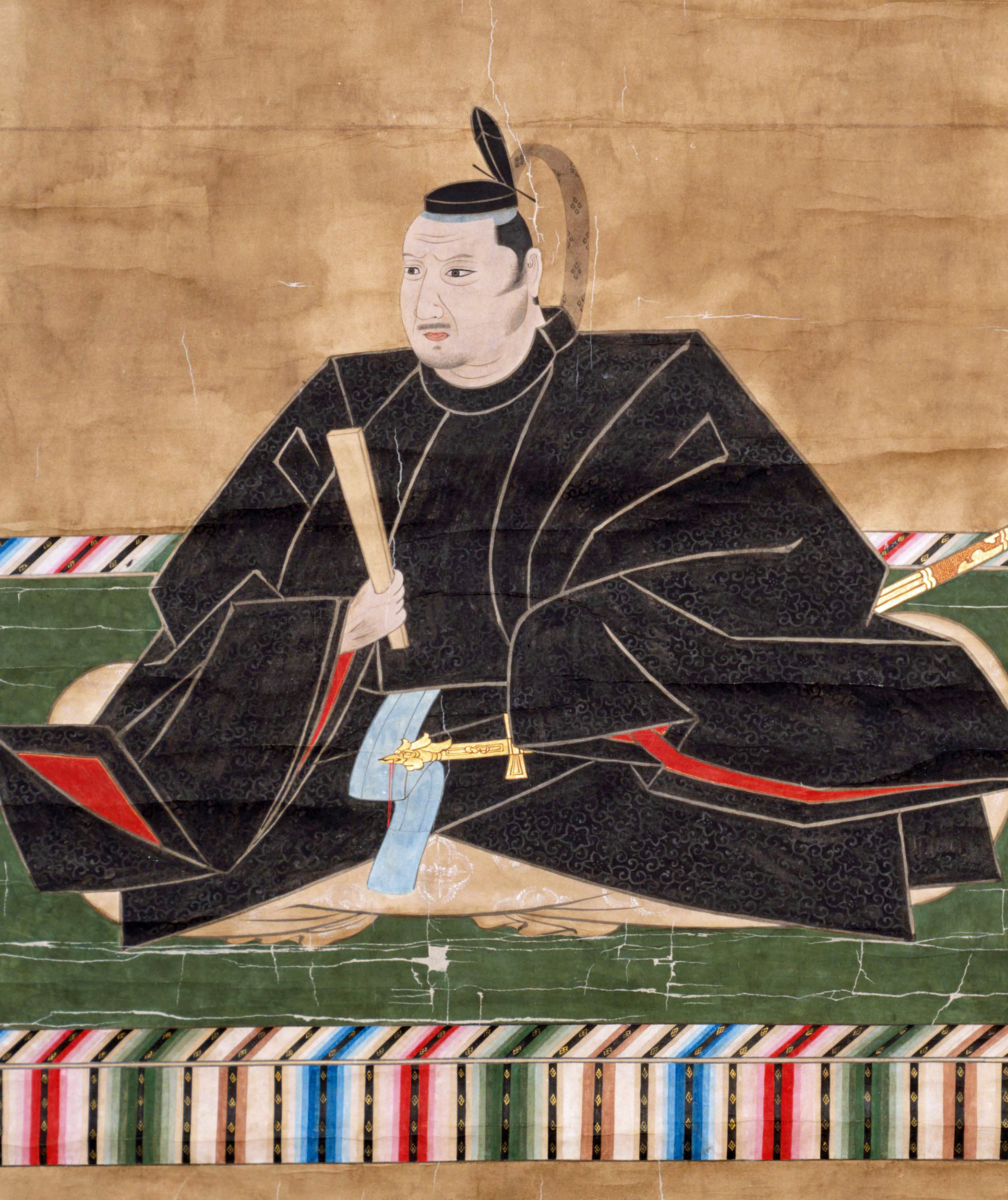
- Yoshinaga Asano (1576–1613), Japanese samurai
- Pronunciation: joɕinaga (IPA)
- Gender: Male

Origin
- Origin: Japanese
- Meaning: depends on the kanji used.

Other names
- Alternative spelling: Yosinaga (Kunrei-shiki) Yosinaga (Nihon-shiki) Yoshinaga (Hepburn)

Yoshinaga is both a masculine Japanese given name and a Japanese surname.

== Written forms ==
Yoshinaga can be written using different combinations of kanji characters. Here are some examples:

- 義長, "justice, long"
- 義永, "justice, eternity"
- 佳長, "skilled, long"
- 佳永, "skilled, eternity"
- 善長, "virtuous, long"
- 善永, "virtuous, eternity"
- 吉長, "good luck, long"
- 吉永, "good luck, eternity"
- 良長, "good, long"
- 良永, "good, eternity"
- 恭長, "respectful, long"
- 嘉長, "excellent, long"
- 嘉永, "excellent, eternity"
- 能長, "capacity, long"
- 喜長, "rejoice, long"

The name can also be written in hiragana よしなが or katakana ヨシナガ.

== Notable people with the given name Yoshinaga ==
- Yoshinaga Ouchi (大内 義長, 1532–1557), 16th century Kyushu warrior
- Yoshinaga Asano (浅野 幸長, 1576–1613), Japanese samurai and feudal lord of the late Sengoku and early Edo period
- Yoshinaga Fujita (藤田 宜永, 1950–2020), award-winning novelist and screenwriter from Japan
- Yoshinaga Matsudaira (松平 慶永, 1828–1890), the 14th head of Fukui Domain during the Late Tokugawa shogunate and politician of the Meiji era

== Notable people with the surname Yoshinaga ==
- Aiko Herzig-Yoshinaga (アイコ・ハージック・ヨシナガ, 1924–2018), American political activist who played a major role in the Japanese American redress movement
- Fumi Yoshinaga (よしなが ふみ, born 1971), Japanese manga artist, known for her shōjo and shōnen-ai works
- Kazuki Yoshinaga (吉永 一貴; born 1999), Japanese speed skater
- Nadao Yoshinaga (ナダオ・ヨシナガ, 1919–2009), Japanese-American politician
- Sayuri Yoshinaga (吉永 小百合, born 1945), Japanese actress
- Shoi Yoshinaga (吉永 昇偉; born 2000), Japanese footballer

== Fictional characters ==
- Miyuki Yoshinaga (吉永 みゆき), human disguise of the Orchid Undead from Kamen Rider Blade
- Yukari Yoshinaga, a minor character from Ultraman Max

== See also ==
- Yoshinaga, Okayama, former town located in Wake District, Japan
- Yoshinaga Station, train station in Bizen, Okayama Prefecture, Japan
- Yoshinaga-san Chi no Gargoyle, a Japanese light novel series written by Sennendou Taguchi
