= 2018 Prince Takamado U-18 Premier League =

Prince Takamado JFA U-18 Premier League for 2018

Prince Takamado JFA U-18 Premier League
- Season: 2018
- Dates: 7 April – 9 December
- Champions: Sanfrecce Hiroshima (4th title)
- Relegated: FC Tokyo; Toyama Daiichi; Hannan; Yonago Kita
- Matches played: 180
- Goals scored: 585 (3.25 per match)
- Top goalscorer: East: Riku Danzaki (16 goals); West: Kohei Hattori (15 goals)
- Biggest home win: East: Aomori Yamada 5–0 Toyama Daiichi (15 April); Aomori Yamada 6–1 Júbilo Iwata (24 June); West: Sanfrecce Hiroshima 5–0 Yonago Kita (1 July); Sanfrecce Hiroshima 6–1 Kyoto Sanga (9 December)
- Biggest away win: East: RKU Kashiwa 0–4 Aomori Yamada (9 September); West: Vissel Kobe 0–4 Kyoto Sanga (23 June); Vissel Kobe 0–4 Nagoya Grampus (15 July); Hannan 1–5 Gamba Osaka (16 July); Yonago Kita 0–4 Nagoya Grampus (14 November)
- Highest scoring: East: FC Tokyo 1–6 Kashiwa Reysol (16 July); Kashiwa Reysol 2–5 Kashima Antlers (2 September); West: Gamba Osaka 5–5 Nagoya Grampus (8 April)

The 2018 Prince Takamado JFA U-18 Football Premier League (Japanese: 高円宮杯 JFA U-18サッカープレミアリーグ 2018, Hepburn: Takamado no Miya-hai JFA U-18 Sakkā Puremia Rīgu 2018) was the 30th season of the main competition for under-18 teams in Japan and the 9th after rebranding the competition to the current "Premier League" format.

Kashima Antlers won the Premier League East, and Sanfrecce Hiroshima won the Premier League West. The teams met in the final, which Sanfrecce won by 2–1, being then crowned champions.

== Changes from the previous season ==
Promoted from the Prince Leagues	Relegated to the Prince Leagues (East)	Relegated to the Prince Leagues (West)
RKU Kashiwa; Júbilo Iwata; Toyama Daiichi; Nagoya Grampus	Omiya Ardija; Yokohama F. Marinos	Kobe Koryo Gakuen; Ohzu

== Participating clubs ==
=== Premier League East ===
Team	Prefecture
Aomori Yamada High School	Aomori
Kashima Antlers	Ibaraki
Urawa Red Diamonds	Saitama
Ichiritsu Funabashi High School	Chiba
Kashiwa Reysol	Chiba
Ryutsu Keizai University Kashiwa High School	Chiba
FC Tokyo	Tokyo
Toyama Daiichi High School	Toyama
Shimizu S-Pulse	Shizuoka
Júbilo Iwata	Shizuoka

=== Premier League West ===
Team	Prefecture
Nagoya Grampus	Aichi
Kyoto Sanga	Kyoto
Hannan University High School	Osaka
Gamba Osaka	Osaka
Cerezo Osaka	Osaka
Vissel Kobe	Hyogo
Yonago Kita High School	Tottori
Sanfrecce Hiroshima	Hiroshima
Avispa Fukuoka	Fukuoka
Higashi Fukuoka High School	Fukuoka

== League table ==
=== Premier League East ===
Pos	Team	Pld	W	D	L	GF	GA	GD	Pts	Promotion or relegation
1	Kashima Antlers	18	13	3	2	27	12	+15	42	Qualification for Premier League final
2	Aomori Yamada	18	10	7	1	47	14	+33	37	
3	Shimizu S-Pulse	18	9	4	5	26	15	+11	31	
4	RKU Kashiwa	18	8	4	6	16	16	0	28	
5	Kashiwa Reysol	18	5	6	7	28	25	+3	21	
6	Ichiritsu Funabashi	18	6	3	9	21	27	−6	21	
7	Urawa Red Diamonds	18	4	8	6	14	19	−5	20	
8	Júbilo Iwata	18	6	2	10	14	26	−12	20	
9	FC Tokyo	18	4	7	7	19	29	−10	19	Relegation to the Prince Leagues
10	Toyama Daiichi	18	1	4	13	11	40	−29	7	Relegation to the Prince Leagues

Source: soccer-db.net
Rules for classification: 1) Points; 2) Goal difference; 3) Goals scored; 4) Head-to-head points; 5) Head-to-head goal difference; 6) Head-to-head goal scored; 7) Fair-play points.

=== Premier League West ===
Pos	Team	Pld	W	D	L	GF	GA	GD	Pts	Promotion or relegation
1	Sanfrecce Hiroshima	18	11	4	3	47	19	+28	37	Qualification for Premier League final
2	Gamba Osaka	18	10	5	3	56	37	+19	35	
3	Nagoya Grampus	18	10	4	4	48	28	+20	34	
4	Kyoto Sanga	18	10	3	5	31	31	0	33	
5	Higashi Fukuoka	18	9	4	5	43	34	+9	31	
6	Cerezo Osaka	18	9	2	7	28	22	+6	29	
7	Vissel Kobe	18	7	0	11	25	39	−14	21	
8	Avispa Fukuoka	18	6	2	10	28	38	−10	20	
9	Hannan	18	4	2	12	27	43	−16	14	Relegation to the Prince Leagues
10	Yonago Kita	18	1	0	17	15	57	−42	3	Relegation to the Prince Leagues

Source: soccer-db.net
Rules for classification: 1) Points; 2) Goal difference; 3) Goals scored; 4) Head-to-head points; 5) Head-to-head goal difference; 6) Head-to-head goal scored; 7) Fair-play points.

== Promotion/relegation play-offs ==
As usual, the 16 top-ranked teams of the nine Prince League divisions entered the play-offs. They were split into four blocks, with each block winner (highlighted in bold) qualifying for the 2021 Premier League.

=== Block A ===
14 December 1st round	Yaita Chuo HS	**1–0**	Rissho University Shonan HS	Hiroshima
11:00	Keisuke Ito 35'	Report		Stadium: Hiroshima Regional Park No.1 Ball Game Stadium; Attendance: 300; Referee: Shuhei Ishimaru

14 December 1st round	Shizuoka Gakuen HS	**1–3**	Ohzu HS	Hiroshima
11:00	Yuta Matsumura 19'	Report	Yusei Otake 3'; Rei Okuhara 40'; Koki Matsubara 89'	Stadium: Mitsutoyo Sports Park Gohara; Attendance: 210; Referee: Daisuke Yamaguchi

16 December 2nd round	Yaita Chuo HS	**1–3**	**Ohzu HS**	Hiroshima
11:00	Tsubasa Iijima 56'	Report	Yusei Otake 43'; Shun Osaki 54', 89'	Stadium: Coca-Cola Bottlers Japan Hiroshima Stadium; Attendance: 600; Referee: Shuhei Ishimaru

=== Block B ===
14 December 1st round	Tokai University Osaka Gyosei HS	**2–2** (a.e.t.) (**8–7** p)	Vegalta Sendai	Hiroshima
11:00	Shuta Yano 47'; Itsuki Nakamoto 57'	Report	Ryoji Yamashita 75'; Naito Yoshida 90+3'	Stadium: Coca-Cola Bottlers Japan Hiroshima Stadium; Attendance: 300; Referee: Masaki Kuniyoshi
	**Penalties**
	Tatsuki Nakayashiki (penalty scored); Itsuki Nakamoto (penalty missed); Seiya Fujita (penalty scored); Shohei Yukawa (penalty scored); Rin Mito (penalty scored); Takumi Maejima (penalty scored); Kohei Shoji (penalty scored); Takeru Masuzawa (penalty scored); Sora Tono (penalty missed); Kakeru Setoyama (penalty scored)		(penalty scored) Ryoji Yamashita; (penalty missed) Yuito Sato; (penalty scored) Kazumasa Shimizu; (penalty scored) Naito Yoshida; (penalty scored) Taku Takahashi; (penalty scored) Manato Kudo; (penalty scored) Moeto Takita; (penalty scored) Kento Awano; (penalty missed) Hiroto Yamada; (penalty missed) Aoi Kudo

14 December 1st round	Sagan Tosu	**0–3**	Omiya Ardija	Hiroshima
11:00		Report	Shoi Yoshinaga 27'; Soya Takada 45+1', 55'	Stadium: Hiroshima Regional Park Auxiliary Stadium; Attendance: 200; Referee: Yusuke Ohashi

16 December 2nd round	Tokai University Osaka Gyosei HS	**1–3**	**Omiya Ardija**	Hiroshima
11:00	Takumi Maejima 59'	Report	Shoi Yoshinaga 69', 77'; Yutaro Hayashi 72'	Stadium: Hiroshima Regional Park No.1 Ball Game Stadium; Attendance: 450; Referee: Masakazu Kato

=== Block C ===
14 December 1st round	Shoshi HS	**1–1** (a.e.t.) (**4–3** p)	JFA Academy Fukushima	Hiroshima
13:30	Taiju Yoshida 38'	Report	Asahi Uenaka 90+4'	Stadium: Hiroshima Regional Park No.1 Ball Game Stadium; Attendance: 170; Referee: Shunta Uchiyama
	**Penalties**
	Sukai Numata (penalty missed); Shunsuke Ishikawa (penalty scored); Takumi Kawamura (penalty scored); Takeru Okawa (penalty missed); Kota Nakakawaji (penalty scored); Kensuke Sakashita (penalty scored)		(penalty scored) Kenta Kikuchi; (penalty missed) Satoru Nozue; (penalty scored) Asahi Uenaka; (penalty scored) Hijiri Kato; (penalty missed) Gijo Sehata; (penalty missed) Hayato Tamaoka

14 December 1st round	Asahikawa Jitsugyo HS	**0–7**	Yokohama F. Marinos	Hiroshima
13:30		Report	Naoki Tsubaki 10', 36'; Shunosuke Suzuki 23'; Eitaro Matsuda 51', 56'; Takumi Tsukui 63'; Noah Kenshin Browne 70'	Stadium: Mitsutoyo Sports Park Gohara; Attendance: 93; Referee: Kentaro Uematsu

16 December 2nd round	**Shoshi HS**	**2–1**	Yokohama F. Marinos	Hiroshima
13:30	Own goal 60' (o.g.); Itsuki Someno 90'	Report	Keigo Sakakibara 29'	Stadium: Coca-Cola Bottlers Japan Hiroshima Stadium; Attendance: 500; Referee: Akifumi Kawakatsu

=== Block D ===
14 December 1st round	Sakuyo HS	**0–1**	Ehime FC	Hiroshima
13:30		Report	Masaya Yanashita 76'	Stadium: Coca-Cola Bottlers Japan Hiroshima Stadium; Attendance: 250; Referee: Akitsugu Funabashi

14 December 1st round	Niigata Meikun HS	**2–0**	Konko Osaka HS	Hiroshima
13:30	Naoya Inami 13'; Taketo Ochiai 31'	Report		Stadium: Hiroshima Regional Park Auxiliary Stadium; Attendance: 250; Referee: Takahiro Ogata

16 December 2nd round	**Ehime FC**	**1–0**	Niigata Meikun HS	Hiroshima
13:30	Aoi Okada 9'	Report		Stadium: Hiroshima Regional Park No.1 Ball Game Stadium; Attendance: 350; Referee: Yuichi Hanakawa

== Final ==
15 December
13:00

Kashima Antlers	1–2	Sanfrecce Hiroshima
Manato Sugiyama 64'	Report	Shun Ayukawa 37'; Ryonosuke Ohori 53'

Saitama Stadium 2002, Saitama
Attendance: 9,818
Referee: Ryo Tanimoto

GK	1	(Japan) Taiki Yamada
DF	2	(Japan) Yuki Masataka
DF	3	(Japan) Daigo Masuzaki
DF	5	(Japan) Takatoshi Sato
DF	6	(Japan) Shuto Kumada	(substituted off) 57'
DF	7	(Japan) Shogo Sasaki
DF	15	(Japan) Yohan Namaizawa	(substituted off) 57'
MF	8	(Japan) Tatsuki Onuma
MF	10	(Japan) Taira Maeda (c)
FW	9	(Japan) Kotaro Arima	(substituted off) 90'
FW	19	(Japan) Mikhael Akatsuka
Substitutes:
GK	16	(Japan) Koki Matsuzaki
DF	14	(Japan) Kotaro Kobari	(substituted in) 90'
DF	23	(Japan) Soshi Koda
DF	34	(Japan) Kenta Nemoto
MF	28	(Japan) Kaiyo Yanagimachi	(substituted in) 57' (substituted off) 86'
MF	30	(Japan) Sora Okita	(substituted in) 86'
FW	11	(Japan) Manato Sugiyama	(substituted in) 57'
Manager:
(Japan) Koji Kumagai

GK	1	(Japan) Kaito Sato
DF	5	(Japan) Naoki Suzu
DF	8	(Japan) Taichi Yamasaki
MF	4	(Japan) Hiroya Matsumoto (c)
MF	7	(Japan) Chota Nakatani
MF	10	(Japan) Rikuto Katsura
MF	11	(Japan) Shunki Higashi
MF	12	(Japan) Kodai Dohi
MF	14	(Japan) Ryonosuke Ohori	(substituted off) 90+2'
FW	9	(Japan) Kaito Watanabe
FW	19	(Japan) Shun Ayukawa	(substituted off) 86'
Substitutes:
GK	16	(Japan) Kota Ono
DF	6	(Japan) Hiroto Okoshi	(substituted in) 86'
DF	33	(Japan) Taichi Matsumoto
MF	24	(Japan) Kohei Hosoya	(substituted in) 90+2'
MF	36	(Japan) Takato Takeuchi
FW	20	(Japan) Hayate Tanada
FW	23	(Japan) Ryosei Fukuzaki
Manager:
(Japan) Kentaro Sawada

Assistant referees:
Takeshi Asada
Yusuke Shiotsu
Fourth official:
Takuma Yanaoka

Match rules

- 90 minutes.
- Extra-time if scores still level at the end of regulation time.
- Penalty shoot-out if scores still level at the end of extra time.
- Seven named substitutes.
- Maximum of five substitutions during regulation time, with one more substition allowed if the match needs to go into extra-time.

== Top scorers ==
=== East ===
Rank	Player	Club	Goals
1	(Japan) Riku Danzaki	Aomori Yamada	16
2	(Japan) Mikhael Akatsuka	Kashima Antlers	7
2	(Japan) Kaito Mori	Kashiwa Reysol	7
4	(Chile) Byron Vásquez	Aomori Yamada	6
4	(Japan) Taira Maeda	Kashima Antlers	6
4	(Japan) Hisatoshi Nishido	Ichiritsu Funabashi	6
4	(Japan) Sena Saito	Shimizu S-Pulse	6
4	(Japan) Norihiro Shoda	Kashiwa Reysol	6
9	(Japan) Rikuto Sano	Shimizu S-Pulse	5
9	(Japan) Ginji Sasaki	Aomori Yamada	5
9	(Japan) Ryosuke Yamazaki	Shimizu S-Pulse	5

=== West ===
Rank	Player	Club	Goals
1	(Japan) Retsushi Harada	Gamba Osaka	15
1	(Japan) Kohei Hattori	Kyoto Sanga	15
3	(Japan) Ryonosuke Ohori	Sanfrecce Hiroshima	14
4	(Japan) Kento Hyodo	Nagoya Grampus	11
5	(Japan) Tsubasa Adachi	Gamba Osaka	10
6	(Japan) Hagumi Wada	Hannan	9
7	(Japan) Rikuto Katsura	Sanfrecce Hiroshima	8
7	(Japan) Yuto Otani	Gamba Osaka	8
9	(Japan) Hiroya Matsumoto	Sanfrecce Hiroshima	7
9	(Japan) Shingo Omori	Higashi Fukuoka	7

== See also ==
- Japan Football Association (JFA)

League

- Japanese association football league system
- Prince Takamado Cup
