= Higashi-Okayama Station =

Railway station in Okayama, Japan

Higashi-Okayama Station 東岡山駅
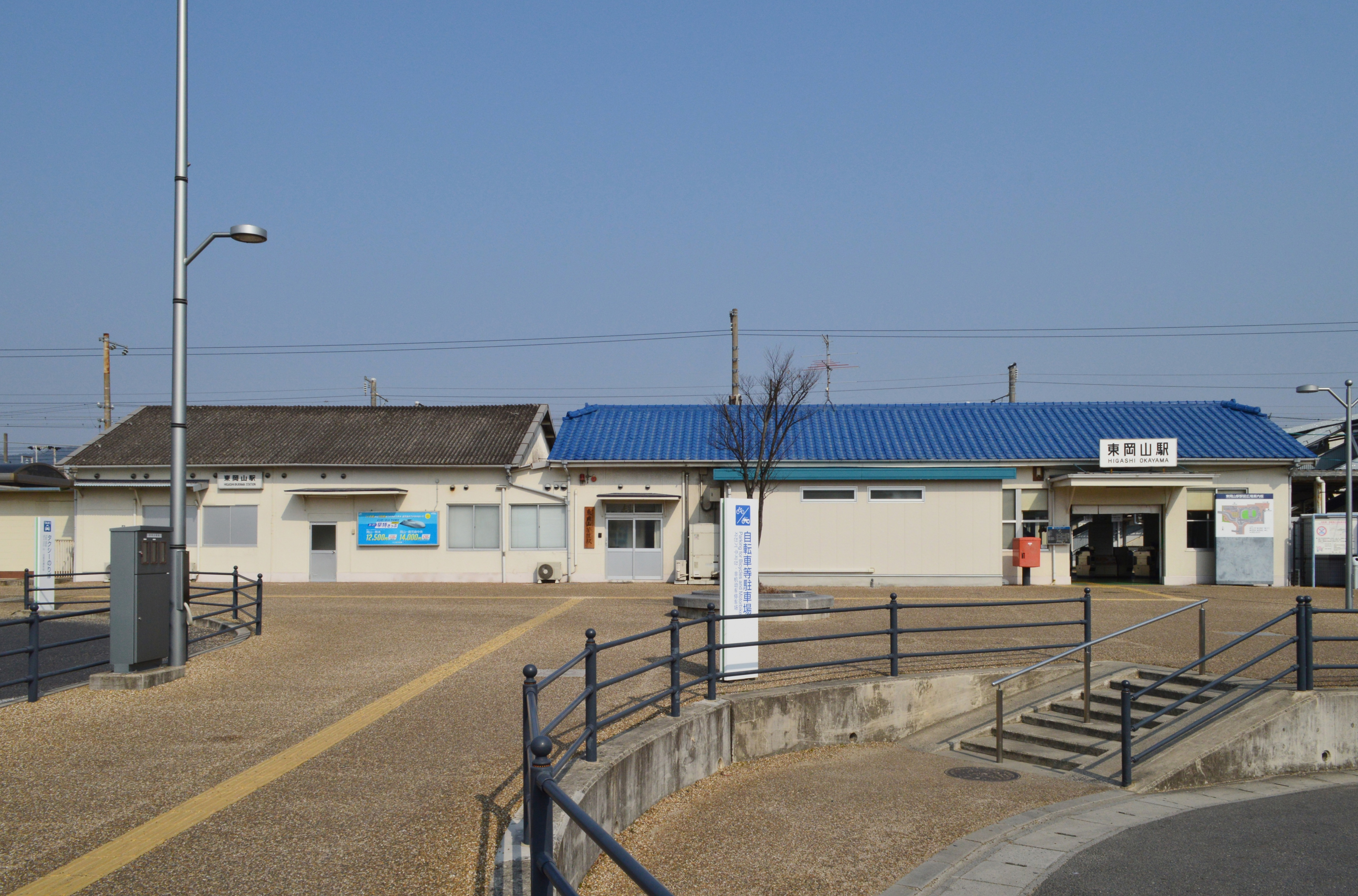
- Higashi-Okayama Station in February 2018

General information
- Location: 112-1 Tsuchida, Naka-ku, Okayama-shi, Okayama-ken 703-8217; Japan
- Coordinates: 34°41′8.30″N 133°59′17.17″E
- Operator: JR West
- Lines: S San'yō Line; N Akō Line
- Distance: 136.1 km (84.6 mi) from Kōbe
- Platforms: 2 side + 1 island platform
- Tracks: 4

Construction
- Structure type: At grade

Other information
- Status: Staffed
- Station code: JR-S04; JR-N04
- Website: Official website

History
- Opened: 18 March 1891
- Former names: Nagaoka (1891-1906); Saidaiji (1906-1961)

Passengers
- FY2019: 3974

Services
Preceding station	JR West	Following station
Takashima towards Okayama	Akō Line Local	Ōdara towards Aioi
Takashima towards Okayama	San'yō Line Local	Jōtō towards Mitsuishi
Location
- Location within Okayama Prefecture Location within Japan

Higashi-Okayama Station (東岡山駅, Higashi-Okayama-eki) is a passenger railway station located in Naka-ku, in the city of Okayama, Okayama Prefecture, Japan. It is operated by West Japan Railway Company (JR West). The station is on the border between Naka-ku and Higashi-ku, and part of Platform 1 extends into Higashi-ku.

== Lines ==
Higashi-Okayama Station is served by the San'yō Main Line and is 136.1 km from the starting of the Sanyo Main Line at Kōbe Station. It is also the nominal terminus of the Akō Line and is 57.4 kilometers from the opposing terminus of that line at Aioi, although currently all trains on the Akō Line go directly to the west to terminate at Okayama Station via the San'yō Main Line tracks.

== Layout ==
The station has two side platforms and one island platform, serving a total of four tracks, connected by footbridges. The station is staffed.

=== Platforms ===
1	■ N Akō Line	for Okayama and Fukuyama
2	■ S San'yō Main Line	for Okayama and Fukuyama
3	■ N Akō Line	for Saidaiji and Banshū-Akō
4	■ S San'yō Main Line	for Wake and Himeji

== History ==
Higashi-Okayama Station opened on 18 March 1891, initially named Nagaoka Station (長岡駅). It was renamed Saidaiji Station (西大寺駅) on 1 January 1906, becoming Higashi-Okayama from 20 March 1961.

With the privatization of Japanese National Railways (JNR) on 1 April 1987, the station came under the control of JR West.

== Passenger statistics ==
In fiscal 2019, the station was used by an average of 3974 passengers daily

== Surrounding area ==
- National Route 250
- International Pacific University No. 2 campus
- Higashi Okayama Technical High School
- Okayama Prefectural Okayama School for the Deaf

== See also ==
- List of railway stations in Japan
