= Seto Station =

Railway station in Okayama, Japan

Seto Station 瀬戸駅
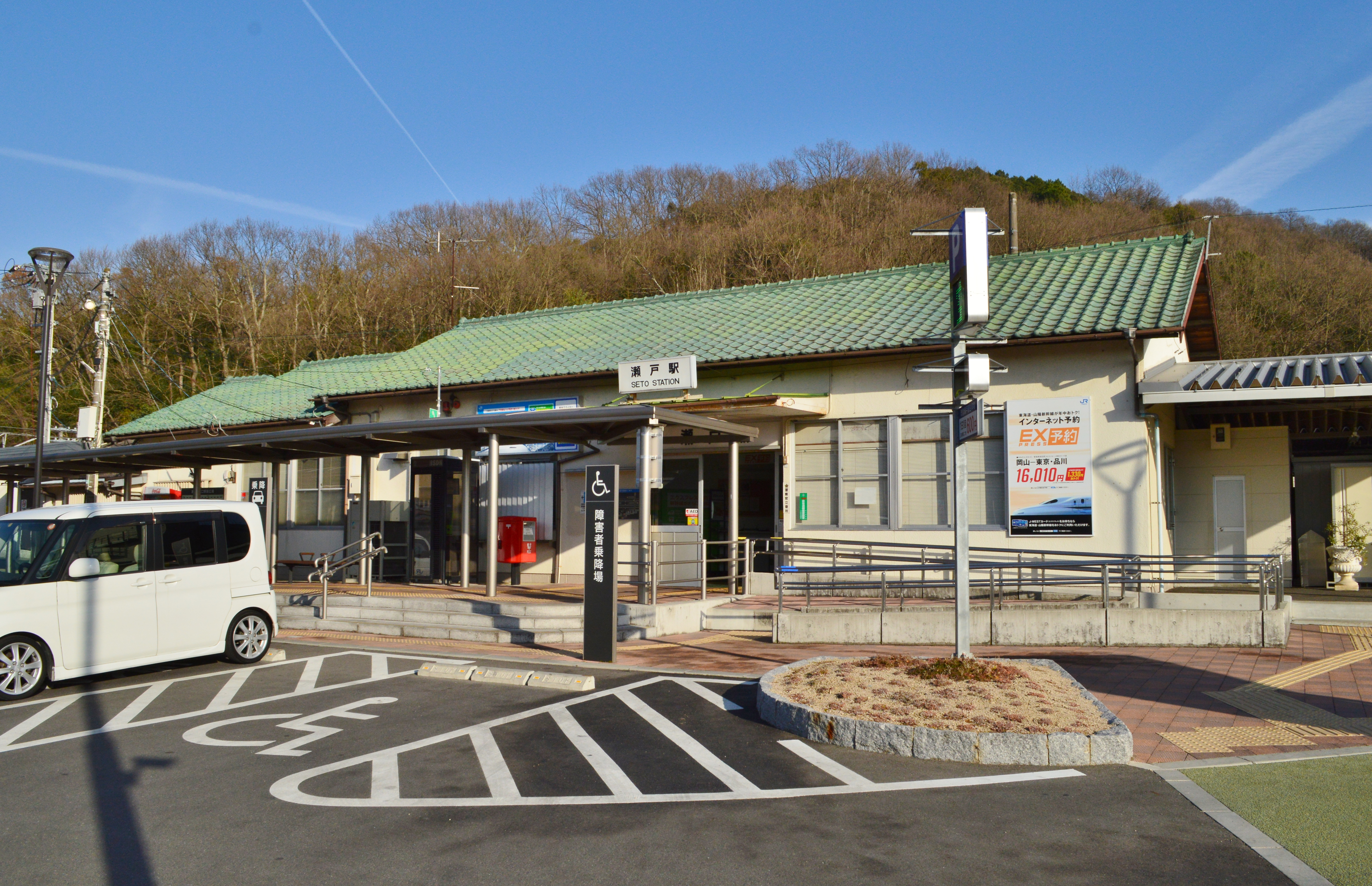
- Seto Station in January 2017

General information
- Location: 91-2 Seto, Setochō, Higashi-ku, Okayama-ken, 709-0861; Japan
- Coordinates: 34°44′3.47″N 134°2′29.83″E
- Owner: West Japan Railway Company
- Operator: West Japan Railway Company
- Line: S San'yō Main Line
- Distance: 128.0 km (79.5 miles) from Kobe
- Platforms: 1 side + 1 island platform
- Tracks: 3
- Connections: Bus stop

Other information
- Status: Unstaffed
- Station code: JR-S06
- Website: Official website

History
- Opened: 18 March 1891

Passengers
- FY2019: 2680 daily

Services
Preceding station	JR West	Following station
Jōtō towards Okayama	San'yō Line Local	Mantomi towards Mitsuishi
Location
- Location within Okayama Prefecture Location within Japan

Seto Station (瀬戸駅, Seto-eki) is a passenger railway station located in Higashi-ku in the city of Okayama, Okayama Prefecture, Japan. It is operated by the West Japan Railway Company (JR West).

== Lines ==
Seto Station is served by the JR West San'yō Main Line, and is located 128.0 kilometers from the terminus of the line at Kobe.

== Station layout ==
The station consists of a side platform and an island platform, with the station building is located on the side of the side platform for Himeji (Platform 1), and connected to the island platform for Okayama (Platforms 2 and 3) by a footbridge. The station is staffed.

=== Platforms ===
1	■ S San'yō Main Line	for Wake and Himeji
2	■ S San'yō Main Line	for Okayama and Fukuyama

== History ==
Seto Station was opened on 18 March 1891. With the privatization of Japanese National Railways (JNR) on 1 April 1987, the station came under the control of JR West.

== Passenger statistics ==
In fiscal 2019, the station was used by an average of 2680 passengers daily

== Surrounding area ==
- Okayama City Higashi Ward Office Seto Branch (Former Seto Town Hall)
- Okayama Prefectural Seto High School
- Okayama Municipal Seto Junior High School

== See also ==
- List of railway stations in Japan
