= Uragami =

Uragami (written: 浦上) is a Japanese surname. Notable people with the surname include:

- Uragami Gyokudō (浦上 玉堂, 1745–1820), Japanese musician, painter, poet and calligrapher
- Uragami Munekage (浦上 宗景), Japanese samurai and commander
- Seishuu Uragami (浦上 晟周, born 1999), Japanese actor

== Fictional characters ==
- Uragami, a character in the manga series Parasyte
