= Shōda temple ruins =

Asuka period temple ruins in Okayama, Japan

- 賞田廃寺跡 (Japanese)
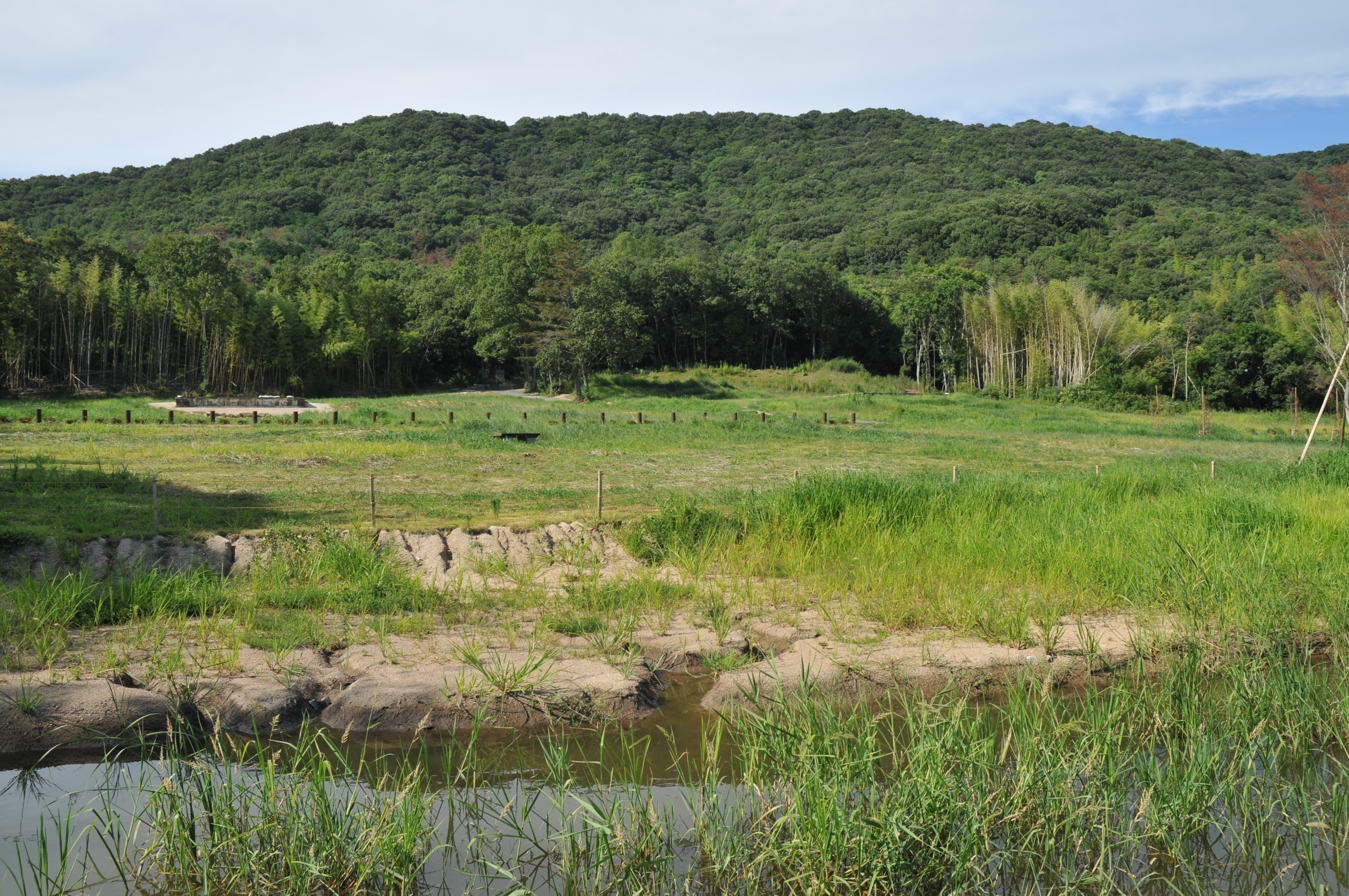
- Shōda temple ruins

- Shōda temple ruins Shōda temple ruins (Japan)
- Interactive map of Shōda temple ruins
- 34°41′53.8″N 133°57′43.1″E
- Type: temple ruin
- Periods: Asuka period
- Location: Naka-ku, Okayama, Japan
- Region: San'yō region

History
- Built: c.7th century

Site notes
- Public access: Yes (park)

The Shōda temple ruins (賞田廃寺跡, Shōda Haiji ato) is an archaeological site with the ruins of a Hakuho period Buddhist temple located in the Shōda neighbourhood of what is now Naka-ku in the city of Okayama, in the San'yō region of Japan. The temple no longer exists, but the temple grounds were designated as a National Historic Site in 1972.

== History ==
The Shōda temple ruins are located northeast of the city center of Okayama, at the southern foot of Mount Tatsunokuchi. It has been known for a long time that there is a temple site here, as fragments of roof tiles have often been found, but the name of the temple is unknown as there are no records. It is presumed to be a temple associated with the Kibi-no-Kamimichi clan, a powerful family in the ancient Kingdom of Kibi. Around this site, there are several kofun such as the Tojinzuka Kofun, as well as the ruins of the Bizen Kokufu and the Hata temple ruins, and the surrounding area was one of the centers of ancient Kibi into the Nara period.

A small hall was originally built on this location in the first half of the 7th century. A full-fledged temple was built in the Asuka period in the middle of the 7th century, and reached its peak in the Nara period. After that, it declined and survived in a much reduced state until the Kamakura period in the 13th century, although 2001 excavations confirmed the existence of some kind of Buddhist facility surviving into the Muromachi period.

The archaeological excavation in 1970 revealed that the temple was roughly one chō (approximately 110 meters square), and the foundation stones of the Main hall, pagoda, west gate, cloister, and parts of the surrounding moat and palisade were discovered. In addition, it was found that major improvements were made twice during the Asuka period and the Nara period. During the excavation, artifacts such as ceramics (including Nara Sancai), and roof tiles from each era were unearthed. The base of the pagoda used a tuff stone platform, which was common in major temples in the Kansai region, but is extremely rare among local temples. Together with the unearthed Nara Sancai, this indicates a strong connection between the Kamimichi clan and the Yamato kingdom. A tile kiln was also discovered to the northeast of the temple, where the roof tiles for this temple were fired.

The 2001 excavation confirmed the layout of the temple buildings, and discovered that the foundations for what was thought to be the west gate was actually that of a west tower. This gives the temple a layout similar to that of Yakushi-ji in Nara. Consequently, the Kondō was found to be not on a straight south-to-north line as originally assumed, but was located east of the center line between the east and west pagodas. The reason for this placement is unknown; however, the Kondō was built in the Asuka period in the 7th century, and its foundations is 15.5 meters from east-to-west and 12.6 meters from north-to-south. It was destroyed in a fire in the 14th century. Nine foundation stones were found on the north side of the west pagoda, which are presumed to be from the subsequent Buddhist temple built in the Muromachi period. After the excavation, the foundations of both the east and west towers were restored and the ruins were maintained as an archaeological park.

The site is about a 20-minute walk from Takashima Station on the JR West San'yō Main Line.

== See also ==
- List of Historic Sites of Japan (Okayama)
