= Tenjinyama Castle (Bizen) =

Castle in Okayama, Japan

- 天神山城
- Wake, Okayama Prefecture, Japan
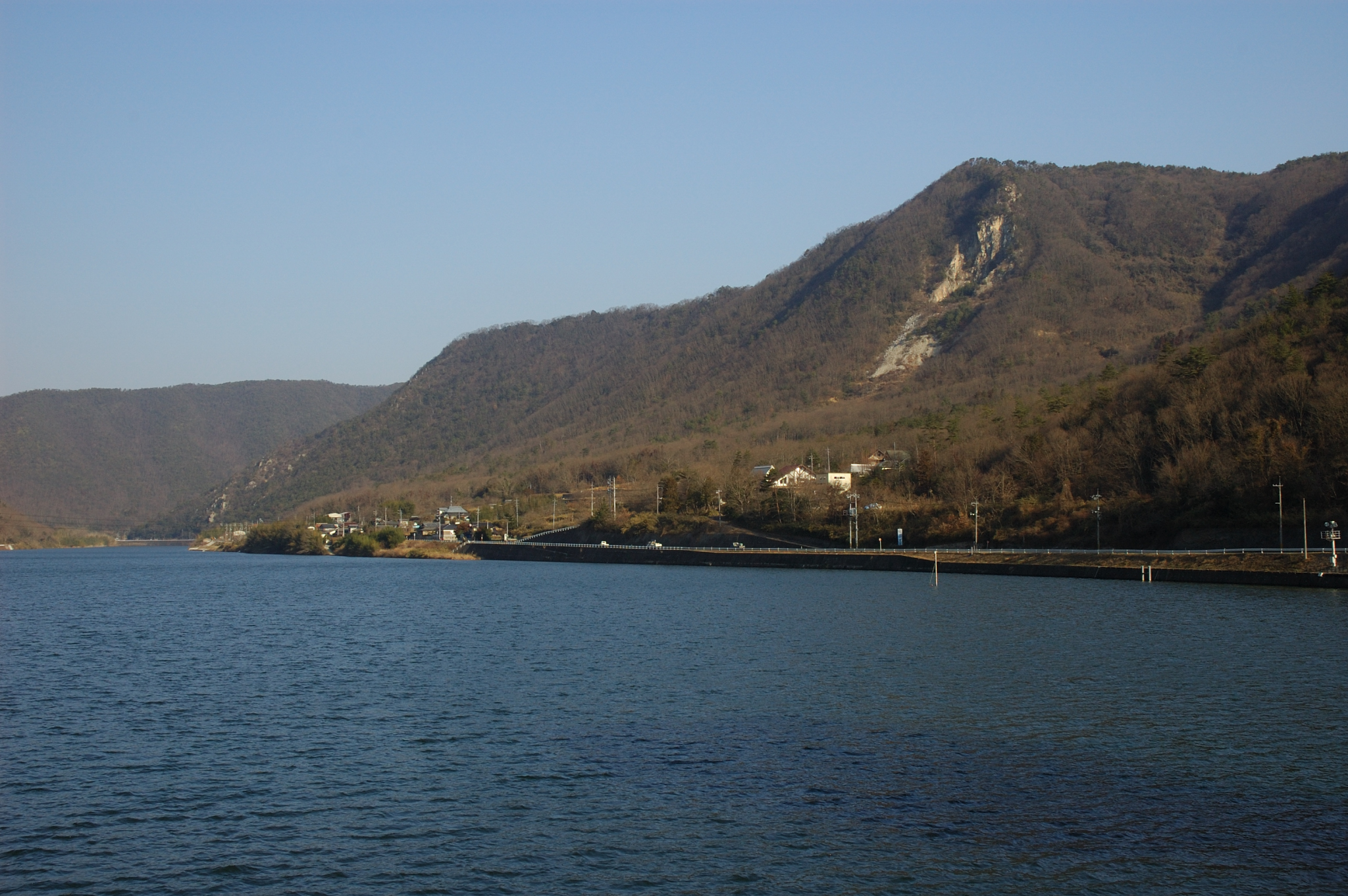
- Tenjinyama Castle

Site information
- Type: Yamajiro-style castle
- Owner: Urakami clan, Ukita clan
- Condition: ruins

Location
- Coordinates: 34°50′57.67″N 134°7′33.58″E

Site history
- Built: 1554
- Built by: Urakami Munekage
- Demolished: 16C

Garrison information
- Past commanders: Urakami Munekage, Ukita Naoie

Tenjinyama Castle (天神山城, Tenjinyama-jō) was a castle located in Tatsuchi, Wake of the former Bizen Province (now Okayama Prefecture) in Japan. Its ruined remains have been protected as a Prefectural Historic Site.

== Layout ==
Tenjinyama Castle was a Yamajiro-style castle built by Urakami Munekage, a Daimyo of the Sengoku period. It is located on the western peak of Mount Tenjin (390m above sea level) along National Route 374, north of the urban area of Wake Town. The steep castle mountain is naturally fortified by the Yoshii River flowing on its west side.

The main bailey and central keep (honmaru) was situated at the summit of the western peak, with the second and third baileys stretching northwest along the ridge. To the southeast of the central keep were additional baileys, including the horse bailey and south bailey, separated by a deep V-shaped trench. Continuing southeast through two stone gates leads to the summit of the eastern peak (409m above sea level), featuring a vantage point with a taiko drum tower to call and organize troops, and a northeast approach known as "Toraguchi" (虎口; literally, "Tiger's Mouth"). Remnants of trenches and earthworks extend over 1 km from the lower bailey area northwest of Mount Tenjin to the southeastern earthworks of the taiko drum tower, indicating the large scale of the fortress.

Currently, ruins of the baileys, earthworks, stone walls, dry moats, and samurai residences remain.

== History ==
The Uragami clan served as deputies (shugo-dai) to the Akamatsu clan, the shugo-daimyo of Harmia, Bizen, and Mimasaka during the Muromachi period. Uragami Munemura, the father of Uragami Munekage, rose to power beyond his lord, Akamatsu Yoshimura, transitioning from a deputy to a sengoku daimyo.

In 1551, Munekage and his elder brother Masamune clashed over the response to the invasion of Bizen by Amago Haruhisa. Masamune sought conciliation while Munekage advocated resistance. This conflict led to Munekage building Tenjinyama Castle in early 1554 as his new stronghold. From this stronghold, Munekage secured victories and consolidated his control over Bizen, with the support of the Mōri clan. At this time, he also took in Ukita Naoie, who became his right-hand man and helped solidify his domain.

In 1564, Masamune and his son Kiyomune were killed by Akamatsu Masahide during Kiyomune's wedding. The following year, Munekage had Masamune's heir assassinated, extinguishing the clan's main line of inheritance in favor of his own and absorbing their territory.

In 1573, Munekage allied with Oda Nobunaga but faced opposition from Naoie, who allied with the Mōri clan. Naoie eventually rebelled against Munekage, supporting Masamune's grandson Hisamatsumaru as the rightful heir and besieging Tenjinyama Castle in 1574. Munekage abandoned the castle and fled to Harima in 1575.

== Dating conflict ==
The fall of Tenjinyama Castle was traditionally dated to 1577 based on Bizen military records, but a study made by historian Katsunari Terao in 1991 suggested that primary sources date the destruction of the castle to 1575 instead. This 1575 dating has become widely accepted by historians.

== See also ==
- List of castles in Japan

== Bibliography ==
- Wada, Kazuyoshi; 畑, 和良 (2003). "浦上宗景権力の形成過程 (Formation Process of Uragami Munekage's Power)". 岡山地方史研究 (Okayama Local History Research) (100).
- Norioka, Minoru; 乗岡, 実 (2000). 中世山城の瓦三題 (Three Tiles of Medieval Mountain Castles). 吉備されど吉備 (Kibi Yet Kibi).
- Nakai, Kiyoshi; 中井, 均 (2002). 置塩城跡の石垣 (Stone Walls of Oushi Castle Ruins). 置塩城跡総合調査報告書 (Oushi Castle Ruins Comprehensive Survey Report).
