= Hata temple ruins =

Asuka period temple ruins in Okayama, Japan

- 幡多廃寺跡 (Japanese)
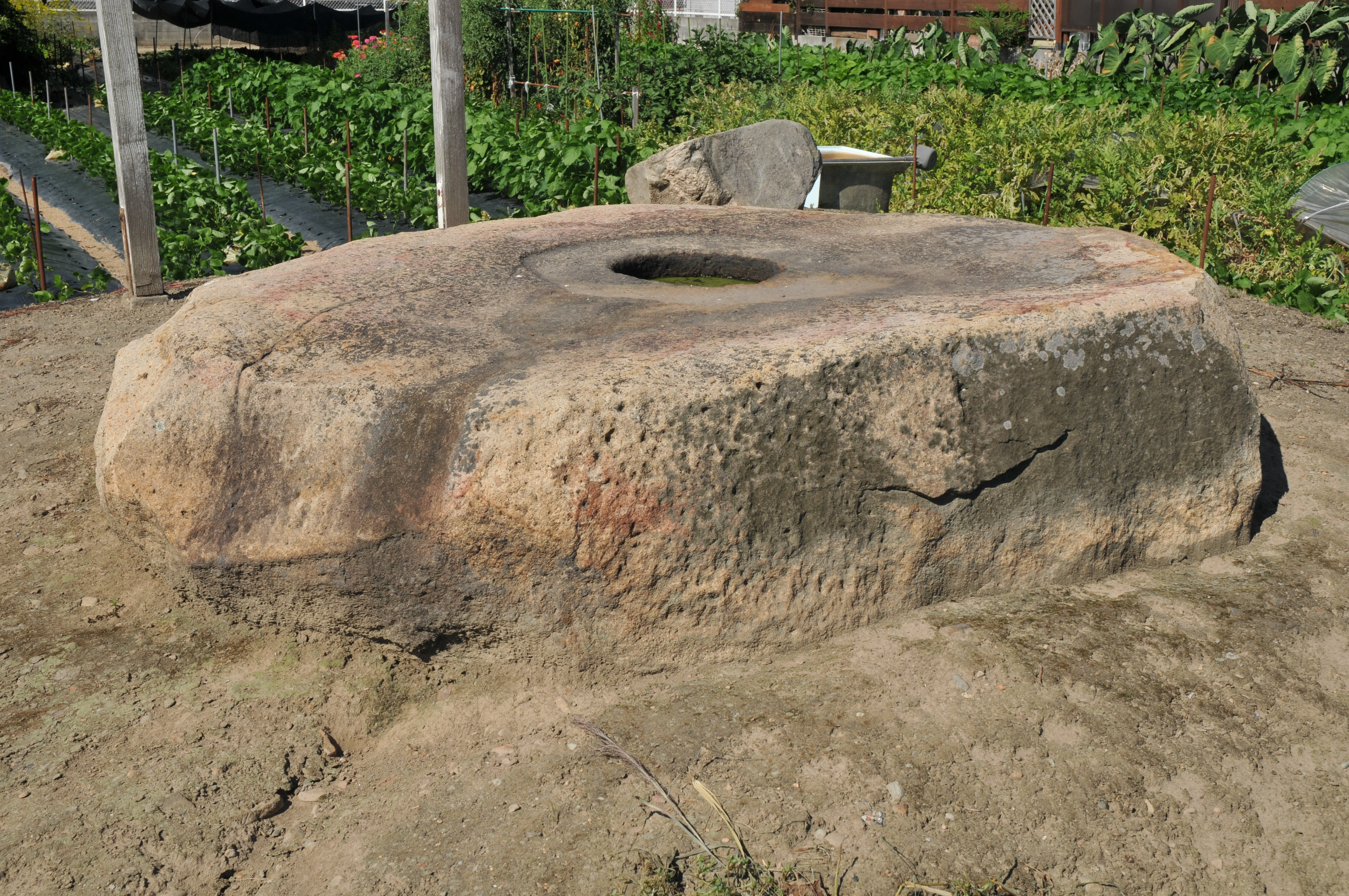
- Hata temple ruins

- Hata temple ruins Hata temple ruins (Japan)
- Interactive map of Hata temple ruins
- 34°40′51.7″N 133°57′41.9″E
- Type: temple ruin
- Periods: Asuka period
- Location: Naka-ku, Okayama, Japan
- Region: San'yō region

History
- Built: c.7th century

Site notes
- Public access: Yes

The Hata temple ruins (幡多廃寺跡, Hata Haiji ato) is an archaeological site with the ruins of a Hakuhō period Buddhist temple located in the Akoda neighbourhood of what is now Naka-ku in the city of Okayama, Okayama Prefecture, in the San'yō region of Japan. The temple no longer exists, but the foundation stone of the pagoda which once existed in the temple grounds was designated as a National Historic Site in 1944.

== History ==
The Hata temple ruins are located in the middle of an alluvial plain on the left bank of the Asahi River, about two kilometers south of the site of Shōda temple ruins, and near the presumed location of the Kokufu of Bizen Province. The name of the temple is unknown as there are no historical records. It is presumed to be a temple associated with the Kibi-no-Kamimichi clan, a powerful family in the ancient Kingdom of Kibi.

The base of the pagoda is exposed in a paddy field and is the largest in Okayama Prefecture, with a major axis of about 2.6 meters and a minor axis of about 2.1 meters with a hexagonal shallow depression in the center, where the central pillar of a Japanese pagoda was erected. Tuff was found around the site of the pagoda, and it is presumed that it had a tuff platform with a masonry foundation similar to the Shōda temple ruins. This type of foundation is found in major temples in the central part of the Kinai region, but is extremely rare among local temples, and shows the strong connection between this temple and the Yamato government. Heat marks can be seen on the surface of the foundation stone, and it is presumed that the pagoda was destroyed by fire.

During the archaeological excavation from 1972 to 1973 of the whole area centering on this foundation stone, the remains of the foundations of the Kondō, Middle gate, cloister, South gate, and North gate were discovered, and it was estimated that the temple area was roughly one chō (approximately 110 meters square), but the exact scale and layout of the temple remains uncertain. Fragments of roof tiles with double petaled lotus patterns from the Hakuho period and flat roof tiles from the Heian period have been unearthed. These indicate that this temple was built in the late Hakuho period, prospered in the Nara period, and is thought to have been abandoned by the 11th century in the late Heian period. In addition, ceramics such as Nara Sancai, round inkstones, and earthenware have also been excavated.

The site is about ten minutes on foot from Takashima Station on the JR West San'yō Main Line.

== See also ==
- List of Historic Sites of Japan (Okayama)
