= Jōtō Station (Okayama) =

Railway station in Okayama, Japan

Jōtō Station 上道駅
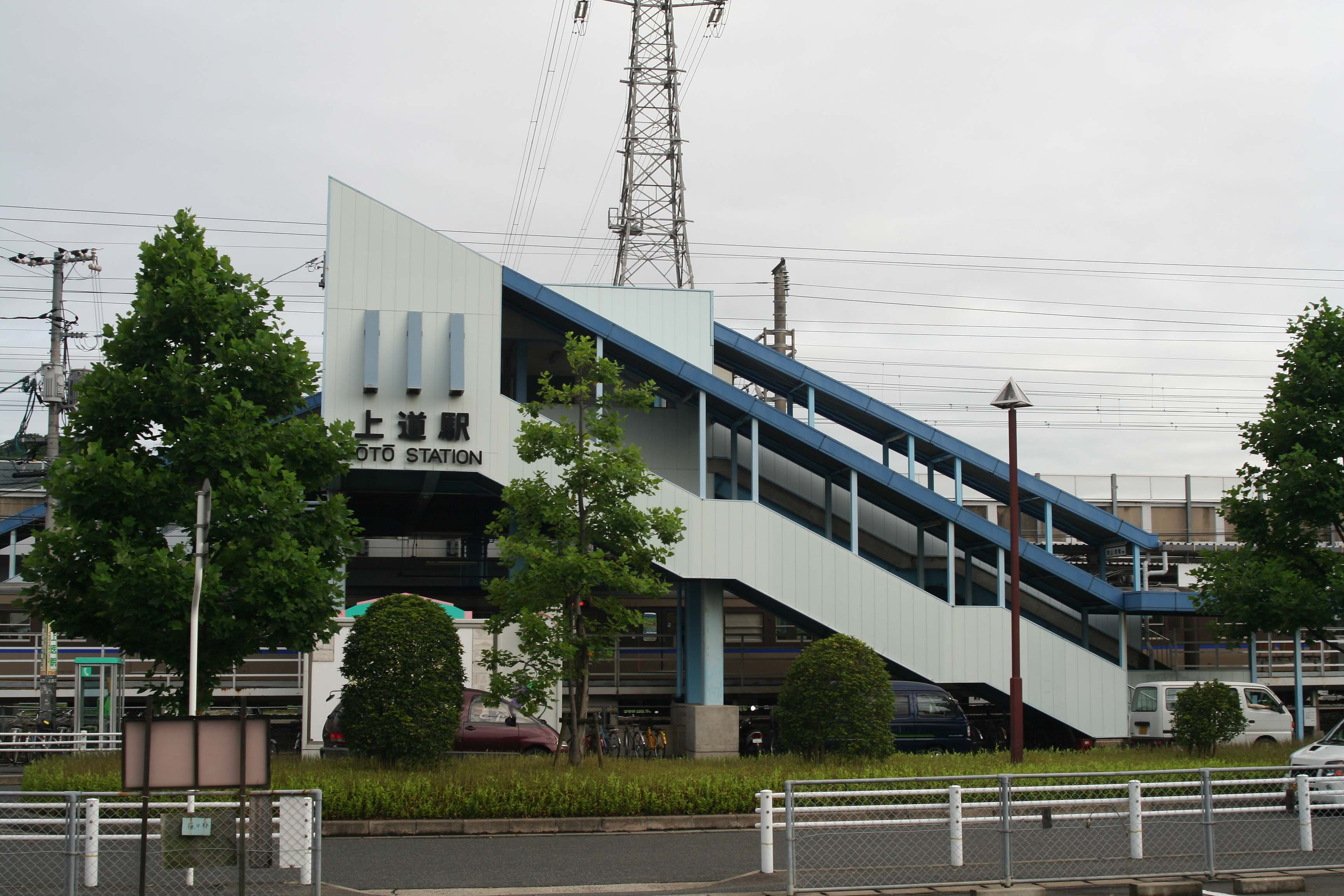
- Jōtō Station in June 2007

General information
- Location: 140-1 Nakao, Higashi-ku, Okayama-ken 709-0626; Japan
- Coordinates: 34°41′57.95″N 134°1′14.47″E
- Owner: West Japan Railway Company
- Operator: West Japan Railway Company
- Line: S San'yō Main Line
- Distance: 132.7 km (82.5 miles) from Kobe
- Platforms: 2 side platforms
- Tracks: 2
- Connections: Bus stop

Other information
- Status: Unstaffed
- Station code: JR-S05
- Website: Official website

History
- Opened: 1 November 1986

Passengers
- FY2019: 1456 daily

Services
| Preceding station | JR West | Following station |
|---|---|---|
| Higashi-Okayama towards Okayama | San'yō Line Local | Seto towards Mitsuishi |
Location
- Location within Okayama Prefecture Location within Japan

Jōtō Station (上道駅, Jōtō-eki) is a passenger railway station located in Higashi-ku in the city of Okayama, Okayama Prefecture, Japan. It is operated by the West Japan Railway Company (JR West).

== Lines ==
Jōtō Station is served by the JR West San'yō Main Line, and is located 132.7 kilometers from the terminus of the line at Kobe.

== Station layout ==
The station consists of two opposed ground-level side platforms, connected by a footbridge. The station is unattended.

=== Platforms ===
| 1 | ■ S San'yō Main Line | for Aioi and Himeji |
| 2 | ■ S San'yō Main Line | for Okayama and Kurashiki |

== History ==
Jōtō Station was opened on 01 November 1986. With the privatization of Japanese National Railways (JNR) on 1 April 1987, the station came under the control of JR West.

== Passenger statistics ==
In fiscal 2019, the station was used by an average of 1456 passengers daily.

== Surrounding area ==
- Higashiokayama Lake Town
- Japan National Route 250
- Okayama Municipal Jotodai Elementary School

== See also ==
- List of railway stations in Japan
