= Takashima Station =

Railway station in Okayama, Japan

Takashima Station 高島駅
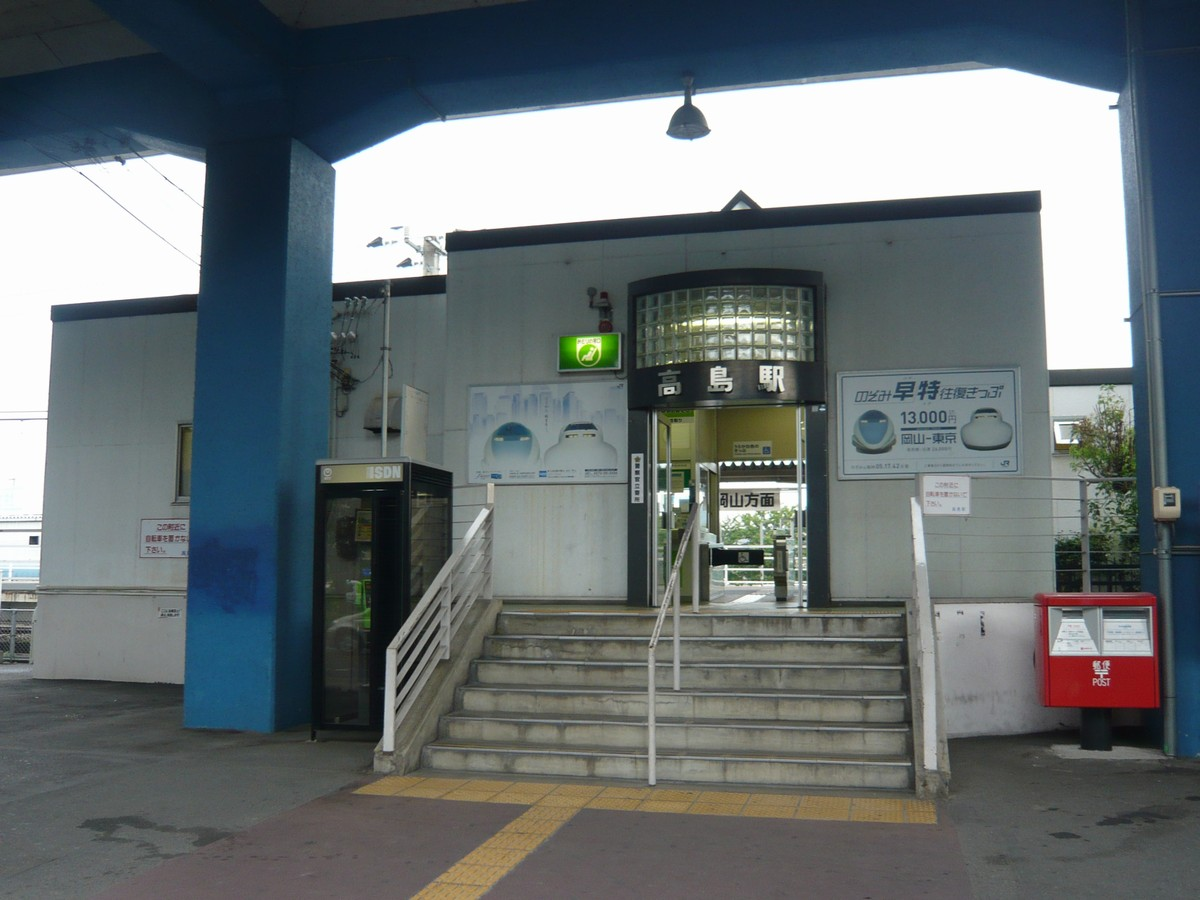
- Takashima Station in February 2018

General information
- Location: 2-5 Shimizu, Naka-ku, Okayama-shi, Okayama-ken 703-8243; Japan
- Coordinates: 34°40′59.45″N 133°57′29.17″E
- Operator: JR West
- Lines: S San'yō Line; N Akō Line
- Distance: 138.9 km (86.3 mi) from Kōbe
- Platforms: 2 side platforms
- Tracks: 2

Construction
- Structure type: At grade

Other information
- Status: Staffed (Midori no Madoguchi)
- Station code: JR-S03; JR-N03
- Website: Official website

History
- Opened: 14 March 1985

Passengers
- FY2019: 3551

Services
Preceding station	JR West	Following station
Nishigawara towards Okayama	Akō Line Local	Higashi-Okayama towards Aioi
Nishigawara towards Okayama	San'yō Line Local	Higashi-Okayama towards Mitsuishi
Location
- Location within Okayama Prefecture Location within Japan

Takashima Station (高島駅, Takashima-eki) is a passenger railway station located in Naka-ku, in the city of Okayama, Okayama Prefecture, Japan. It is operated by West Japan Railway Company (JR West).

== Lines ==
Takashima Station is served by the San'yō Main Line and is 138.9 km from the starting of the Sanyo Main Line at Kōbe Station. It is also served by trains of the Akō Line, which continue past the nominal terminus of that line at Higashi-Okayama to terminate at Okayama Station via the San'yō Main Line tracks.

== Layout ==
The station has two ground level opposed side platforms, connected by a footbridge, located next to the elevated Sanyo Shinkansen tracks. The station has a Midori no Madoguchi staffed ticket office.

=== Platforms ===
1	■ S San'yō Main Line	for Wake and Himeji
1	■ N Akō Line	for Saidaiji and Banshū-Akō
2	■ S San'yō Main Line	for Okayama and Mihara
2	■ N Akō Line	for Okayama and Mihara

== History ==
Takashima Station opened on 14 March 1985. With the privatization of Japanese National Railways (JNR) on 1 April 1987, the station came under the control of JR West.

== Passenger statistics ==
In fiscal 2019, the station was used by an average of 3551 passengers daily

== Surrounding area ==
The surrounding area is a residential area. There is a municipal housing complex on the north side of the station, and in this housing complex there is a police office, a certified children's center, and the Okayama Takashima housing complex post office.

- Okayama Municipal Takashima Elementary School
- Okayama Municipal Asahiryu Elementary School
- Okayama Municipal Takashima Junior High School

== See also ==
- List of railway stations in Japan
