= Mantomi Station =

Railway station in Okayama, Japan

Mantomi Station 万富駅
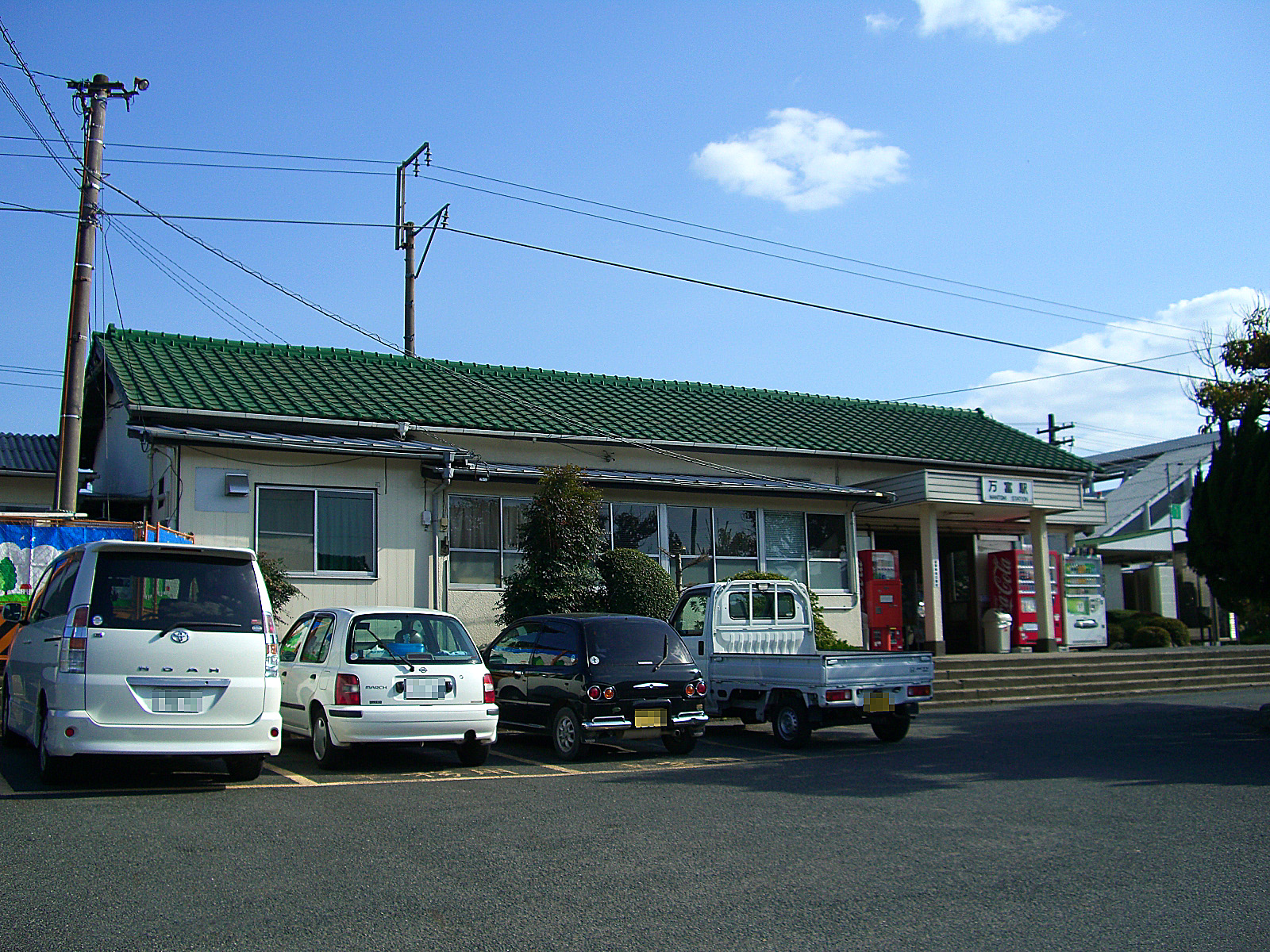
- Mantomi Station in April 2007

General information
- Location: 329-2 Mantomi, Setochō, Higashi-ku, Okayama-ken, 709-0841; Japan
- Coordinates: 34°45′30.34″N 134°4′49.85″E
- Owner: West Japan Railway Company
- Operator: West Japan Railway Company
- Line: S San'yō Main Line
- Distance: 123.5 km (76.7 miles) from Kobe
- Platforms: 1 side + 1 island platform
- Tracks: 3
- Connections: Bus stop

Other information
- Status: Unstaffed
- Station code: JR-S07
- Website: Official website

History
- Opened: 26 December 1897

Passengers
- FY2019: 631 daily

Services
Preceding station	JR West	Following station
Seto towards Okayama	San'yō Line Local	Kumayama towards Mitsuishi
Location
- Location within Okayama Prefecture Location within Japan

Mantomi Station (万富駅, Mantomi-eki) is a passenger railway station located in Higashi-ku in the city of Okayama, Okayama Prefecture, Japan. It is operated by the West Japan Railway Company (JR West).

== Lines ==
Mantomi Station is served by the JR West San'yō Main Line, and is located 123.5 kilometers from the terminus of the line at Kobe.

== Station layout ==
The station consists of a side platform and an island platform, connected by a footbridge. Platform 2 (middle line) shared by trains in both directions, and freight trains also sometimes stop there. The station is unattended.

=== Platforms ===
1	■ S San'yō Main Line	for Aioi and Himeji
2	■ S San'yō Main Line	for Okayama and Mihara

== History ==
Mantomi Station was opened on 26 December 1897 With the privatization of Japanese National Railways (JNR) on 1 April 1987, the station came under the control of JR West.

== Passenger statistics ==
In fiscal 2019, the station was used by an average of 631 passengers daily

== Surrounding area ==
- Okayama City Higashi Ward Office Seto Branch Office
- Okayama Municipal Chikusa Elementary School
- Mantomi Todai-ji Tile Kiln Ruins

== See also ==
- List of railway stations in Japan
