= Kumayama Station =

Railway station in Akaiwa, Okayama Prefecture, Japan

Kumayama Station 熊山駅
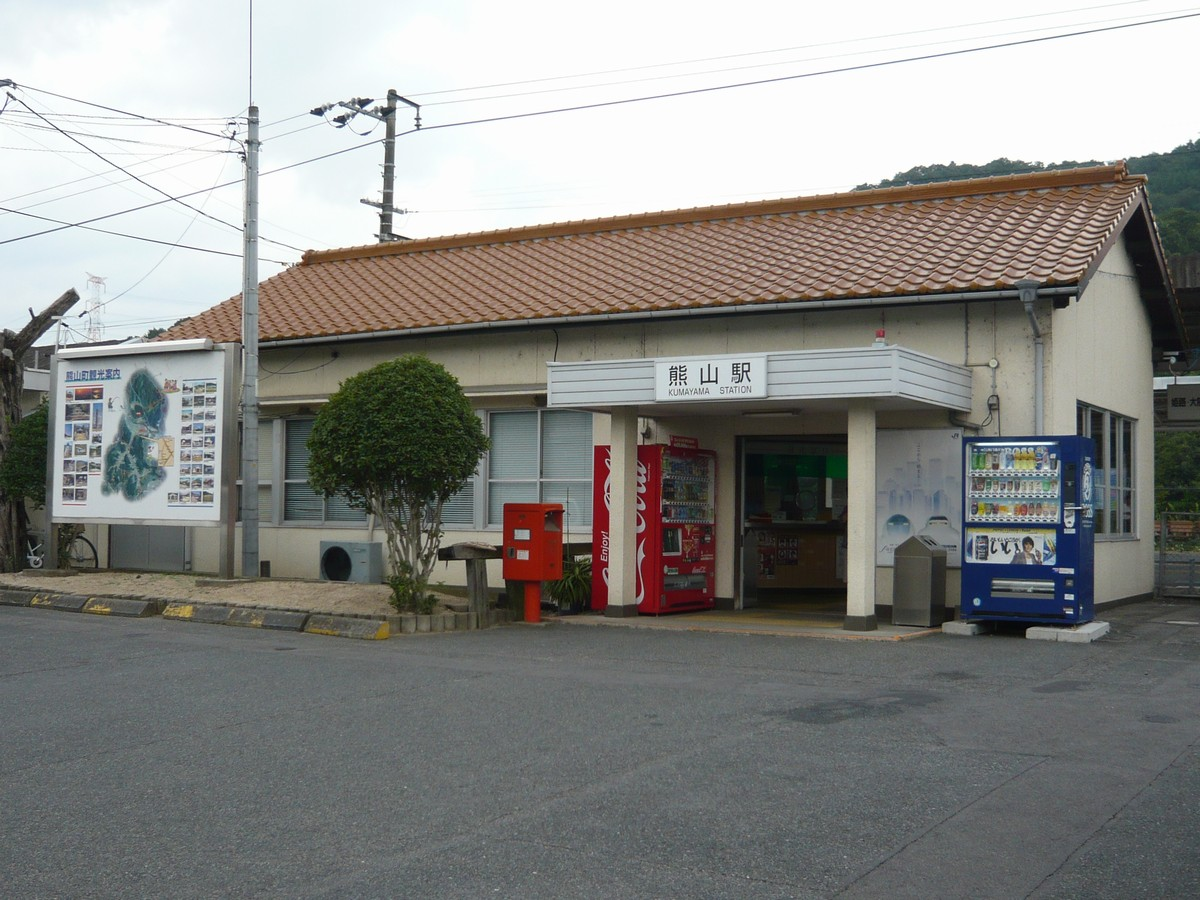
- Kumayama Station in August 2008

General information
- Location: 329-2 Senda, Akaiwa-shi, Okayama-ken 709-0714; Japan
- Coordinates: 34°47′0.55″N 134°6′33.35″E
- Owner: West Japan Railway Company
- Operator: West Japan Railway Company
- Line: S San'yō Main Line
- Distance: 119.4 km (74.2 miles) from Kobe
- Platforms: 2 side platforms
- Tracks: 2
- Connections: Bus stop

Other information
- Status: Unstaffed
- Station code: JR-S08
- Website: Official website

History
- Opened: 11 August 1930

Passengers
- FY2019: 1358 daily

Services
Preceding station	JR West	Following station
Mantomi towards Okayama	San'yō Line Local	Wake towards Mitsuishi
Location
- Location within Okayama Prefecture Location within Japan

Kumayama Station (熊山駅, Kumayama-eki) is a passenger railway station located in the city of Akaiwa, Okayama Prefecture, Japan, operated by the West Japan Railway Company (JR West).

== Lines ==
Kumayama Station is served by the JR San'yō Main Line, and is located 119.4 kilometers from the terminus of the line at Kobe.

== Station layout ==
Originally, the station consisted of a side platform and an island platform, but in 2014, the overhead wire for the middle track, which had largely been used as a siding (former platform No. 2) was removed. The old No. 3 platform has been renumbered to No. 2 platform. Therefore, at present, is effectively two opposed side platforms and two tracks. The station building is located on the side of the platform for Himeji, and is connected to the island platform for Okayama via a footbridge. This footbridge was certified as a modern industrial heritage in February 2009.

=== Platforms ===
1	■ S San'yō Main Line	for Aioi and Himeji
2	■ S San'yō Main Line	for Okayama and Mihara

== History ==
Kumayama Station was opened on 10 July 1917 and upgraded to a full passenger station on 11 August 1930. With the privatization of Japanese National Railways (JNR) on 1 April 1987, the station came under the control of JR West.

== Passenger statistics ==
In fiscal 2019, the station was used by an average of 1358 passengers daily

== Surrounding area ==
- Okayama Hakuryo Junior and Senior High School
- Akaiwa Municipal Iwanashi Junior High School
- Kumayama ruins

== See also ==
- List of railway stations in Japan
