= Wake District, Okayama =

District in Okayama prefecture, Japan

Coordinates: 34.846°N 134.135°E

Location of Wake District in Okayama Prefecture

Wake (和気郡, Wake-gun) is a district located in Okayama Prefecture, Japan.

As of 2003, the district has an estimated population of 30,110 and a population density of 112.02 persons per km^{2}. The total area is 268.79 km^{2}.

== Towns and villages ==
- Wake

== History ==
- On September 1, 1963, the town of Hinase ceded the former village of Fukukawa to Akō, Hyogo Prefecture.
- On March 22, 2005, the towns of Hinase and Yoshinaga merged into the city of Bizen.
- On March 1, 2006, the towns of Wake and Saeki merged to form the new town of Wake.
