= Hinase, Okayama =

Dissolved municipality in Okayama prefecture, Japan

Hinase (日生町, Hinase-chō) was a town located in Wake District, Okayama Prefecture, Japan.

On March 22, 2005, Hinase, along with the towns of Yoshinaga (also from Wake District), was merged into the expanded city of Bizen.

As of 2003, the town had an estimated population of 8,347 and a density of 232.44 persons per km^{2}. The total area was 35.91 km^{2}.

Hinase is best accessed via train, along the Ako line from Okayama station, on the train terminating at Banshu-Ako. Upon arrival at Hinase station, visitors are greeted by the sight of a bay with a huge hill on the other side. Upon the side of the hill is pruned the word Hinase in Hiragana text (ひなせ). At night, this large sign is lit up with light in a beautiful display.

Hinase's main industry is Oyster (kaki) farming. The waters in the area contain many oyster-rafts and are quite picturesque at sunset when viewed from local hilltops. Oyster season is in winter (December to February) and many people come from other towns just to buy oysters from the local fish-market. In mid-February, Hinase hosts its annual Oyster Festival (Kaki-Matsuri. On this day oysters can be purchased fresh and cooked in public BBQ areas for consumption. Local delicacies, such as Kaki-Oko (Oyster Okonomiyaki), a pancake-type dish with cabbage, vegetables, oysters and a piquant sauce) are proudly served up to visitors and locals alike. Also famous in the area are Kaki-Fry (fried oysters) which can be served with a sauce, or in a soft-serve ice-cream covered in soya sauce.

Every summer, on August 13, the town hosts its annual summer fireworks festival (Minato Matsuri). From mid-afternoon, food stalls start selling their fare and amusement stalls offer entertainment for the children. In the evening, the highlight of the festival starts - a display of fireworks over the bay. On a stage nearby, locals perform dances (traditional Japanese-style and modern hip-hop), Taiko (drums) displays and even showcase local bands.
