= Ōdara Yosemiya =

- 大多羅寄宮 (Japanese)
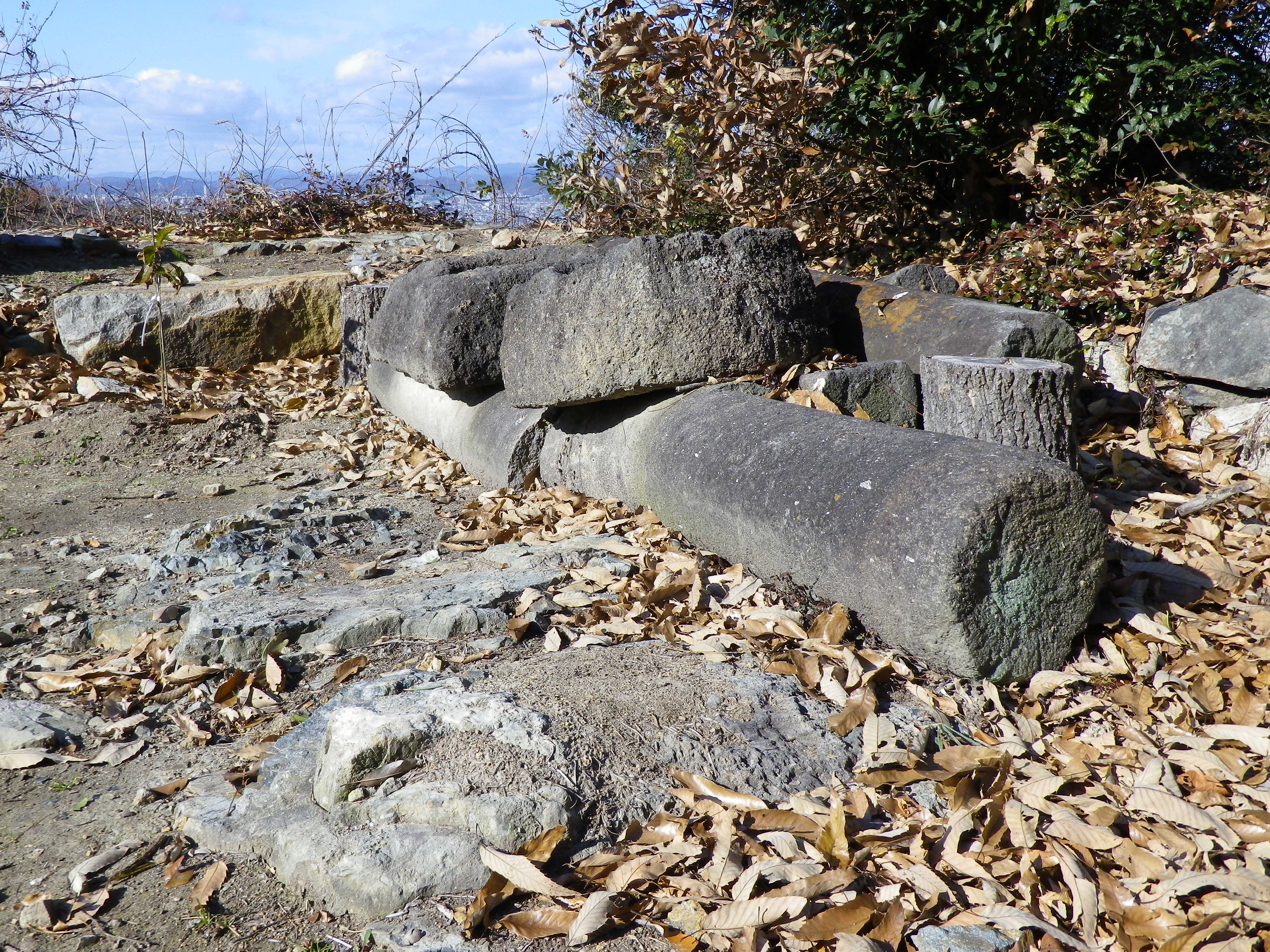
- Ōdara Yosemiya ruins

- Ōdara Yosemiya ruins Ōdara Yosemiya (Japan)
- Interactive map of Ōdara Yosemiya
- 34°40′9.2″N 134°0′29.8″E
- Type: shrine ruin
- Periods: Edo period
- Location: Naka-ku, Okayama, Japan
- Region: San'yō region

History
- Built: c.17th century

Site notes
- Public access: Yes

The Ōdara Yosemiya (大多羅寄宮) was a Shinto shrine located in the Ōdara neighbourhood of what is now Naka-ku in the city of Okayama, in the San'yō region of Japan. The shrine no longer exists, but its ruins were designated as a National Historic Site in 1927.

== History ==
In 1666, Ikeda Mitsumasa, the daimyō of the Okayama Domain, ordered a survey of all Shinto shrines in his territory, and granted official charters to 601 shrines dedicated to various Ubusunagami. The remaining 10,524 shrines were all abolished, and their shintai were collected into 71 newly established. "Yosemiya" shrines (literals "collective shrines") located at each local magistrate's office. In 1712, Ikeda Tsunemasa, the next daimyō, expanded the precincts of Kugunochi Shrine in Ōdara Village and then merged 66 of the 71 Yosemiya together into the enlarged shrine. The Ōdara Yosemiya was maintained by the Ikeda clan to the end of the Edo period, but quickly fell into disrepair after the abolition of the han system and was merged with nearby Fuse Shrine in 1875. At present, the site is in ruins with fragments of stone torii gates and the foundations of the former shrine structures. It was designated as a national historic site in 1927 as a symbol of the unique religious policy of the Okayama Domain.

The Ōdara Yosemiya ruins are about ten minutes on foot from Ōdara Station on the JR West Akō Line.

== See also ==
- List of Historic Sites of Japan (Okayama)
