= Yoshinaga Station =

Railway station in Bizen, Okayama Prefecture, Japan

Yoshinaga Station 吉永駅
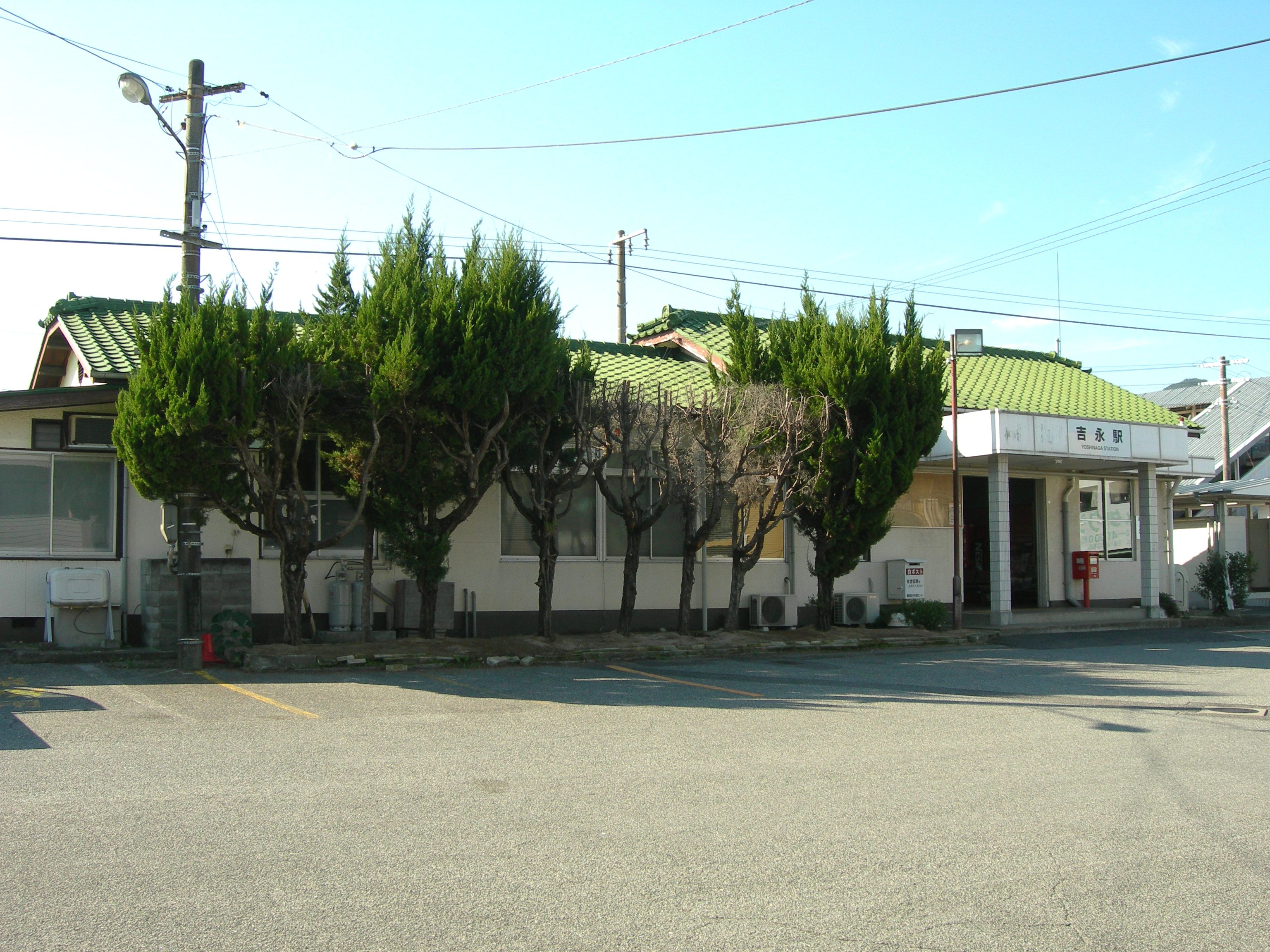
- Yoshinaga Station in October 2010

General information
- Location: 465-1, Yoshinagacho Yoshinaganaka, Bizen-shi, Okayama-ken 709-0224; Japan
- Coordinates: 34°48′44.70″N 134°12′16.55″E
- Owner: West Japan Railway Company
- Operator: West Japan Railway Company
- Line: S San'yō Main Line
- Distance: 102.4 km (63.6 miles) from Kobe
- Platforms: 1 island platform
- Tracks: 2
- Connections: Bus stop

Other information
- Status: Unstaffed
- Station code: JR-S10
- Website: Official website

History
- Opened: 18 March 1891

Passengers
- FY2019: 430 daily

Services
Preceding station	JR West	Following station
Wake towards Okayama	San'yō Line Local	Mitsuishi Terminus
Location
- Location within Okayama Prefecture Location within Japan

Yoshinaga Station (吉永駅, Yoshinaga-eki) is a passenger railway station located in the Yoshinaga neighborhood of the city of Bizen, Okayama Prefecture, Japan, operated by the West Japan Railway Company (JR West).

== Lines ==
Yoshinaga Station is served by the JR San'yō Main Line, and is located 109.5 kilometers from the terminus of the line at Kobe.

== Station layout ==
The station consists of one ground-level side platform and one island platform. The station building is located adjacent to Platform 1 of the side platform, and to Platforms 2 and 3 on the island platform are connected by a footbridge. Most trains use Platforms 1 and 3, and Platform 2 is used only for return trains between Okayama Station and this station (two round trips per day).

=== Platforms ===
1	■ S San'yō Main Line	for Aioi and Himeji
2, 3	■ S San'yō Main Line	for Okayama and Mihara

== History ==
Yoshinaga Station was opened on 18 March 1891. With the privatization of Japanese National Railways (JNR) on 1 April 1987, the station came under the control of JR West.

== Passenger statistics ==
In fiscal 2019, the station was used by an average of 430 passengers daily

== Surrounding area ==
- Bizen City Yoshinaga General Branch
- Bizen City National Health Insurance Municipal Yoshinaga Hospital

== See also ==
- List of railway stations in Japan
