= Ōdara Station =

Railway station in Okayama, Japan

Ōdara Station 大多羅駅
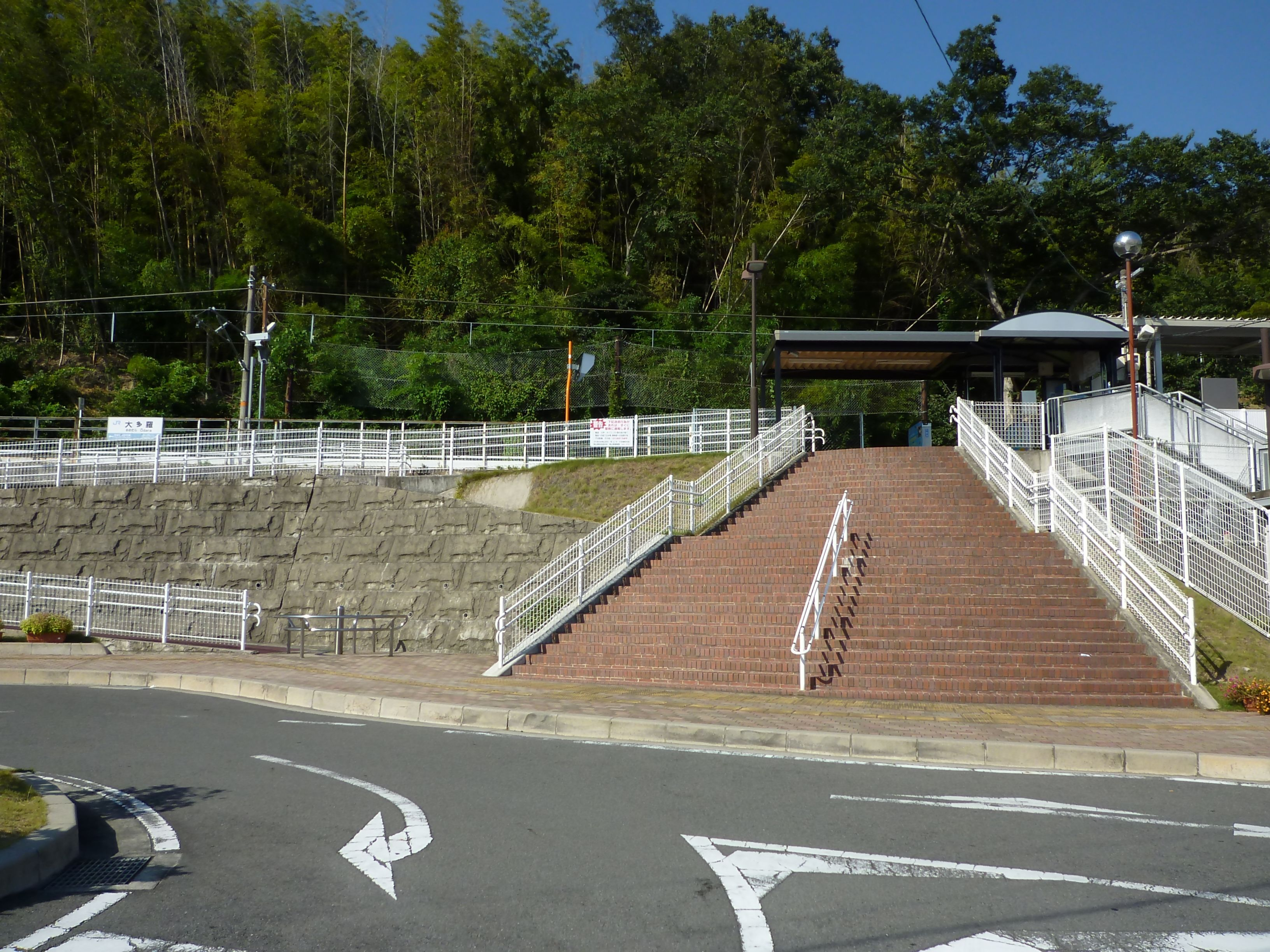
- Ōdara Station in September 2009

General information
- Location: 399 Ōdara-chō, Higashi-ku, Okayama-shi, Okayama-ken 704-8172; Japan
- Coordinates: 34°39′56.32″N 134°0′22.63″E
- Owner: West Japan Railway Company
- Operator: West Japan Railway Company
- Line: N Akō Line
- Distance: 54.1 km (33.6 miles) from Aioi
- Platforms: 1 side platform
- Tracks: 1
- Connections: Bus stop

Other information
- Status: Unstaffed
- Station code: JR-N05
- Website: Official website

History
- Opened: 1 September 1962

Passengers
- FY2019: 1623 daily
Location
- Location within Okayama Prefecture Location within Japan

Ōdara Station (大多羅駅, Ōdara-eki) is a passenger railway station located in Higashi-ku in the city of Okayama, Okayama Prefecture, Japan. It is operated by the West Japan Railway Company (JR West).

== Lines ==
Ōdara Station is served by the JR Akō Line, and is located 54.1 kilometers from the terminus of the line at Aioi and 43.6 kilometers from Banshū-Akō.

== Station layout ==
The station consists of one side platform located on an embankment. The station is unattended.

== Adjacent stations ==
«	Service	»
JR West Akō Line
Saidaiji	-	Higashi-Okayama

== History ==
Ōdara Station was opened on 1 September 1962. With the privatization of Japanese National Railways (JNR) on 1 April 1987, the station came under the control of JR West.

== Passenger statistics ==
In fiscal 2019, the station was used by an average of 1623 passengers daily

== Surrounding area ==
- Okayama Municipal Asahihigashi Junior High School
- Okayama Municipal Kachi Elementary School
- Ōdara Yosemiya ruins

== See also ==
- List of railway stations in Japan
