= Saeki, Okayama =

Dissolved municipality in Okayama prefecture, Japan

Saeki (佐伯町, Saeki-chō) was a town located in Wake District, Okayama Prefecture, Japan.

== Population ==
As of 2003, the town had an estimated population of 4,024 and a density of 66.69 persons per km^{2} (172.73 persons per square mile). The total area was 60.34 square kilometres (23.30 sq mi).

== History ==
On March 1, 2006, Saeki was merged into the expanded town of Wake.
