= Ryoji Yamashita =

Japanese footballer

Ryoji Yamashita 山下 諒時
Personal information
- Full name: Ryoji Yamashita
- Date of birth: May 11, 2000 (age 26)
- Place of birth: Ibaraki, Japan
- Height: 1.79 m (5 ft 10 1/2 in)
- Position: Defender

Team information
- Current team: FC Osaka
- Number: 4

Youth career
- Koga Chuo SSS
- –2015: FC Koga
- 2016–2018: Vegalta Sendai

College career
Years	Team	Apps	(Gls)
2019–2022	Takushoku University		

Senior career*
Years	Team	Apps	(Gls)
2023–2024	SC Sagamihara	59	(0)
2025–	FC Osaka	13	(1)
Total		59	(0)
Medal record
Vegalta Sendai
Runner-up	Emperor's Cup	2018
- * Club domestic league appearances and goals

Ryoji Yamashita (山下 諒時, Yamashita Ryōji; born May 11, 2000) is a Japanese football player who plays for FC Osaka from 2025.

== Club career ==
Yamashita was born in Ibaraki Prefecture on May 11, 2000. He joined J1 League club Vegalta Sendai from youth team in 2018. He debut in J. League Cup Group Stage Matchweek 4 against Albirex Niigata on 18 April at same year.

Yamashita enter to Takushoku University in 2019 until he was graduation in 2022.

On 25 October 2022, Yamashita joined first professional career with J3 club, SC Sagamihara for upcoming 2023 season.

== Career statistics ==
=== Club ===
As of the start from 2023 season.

Club	Season	League			National Cup		League Cup		Other (Note: Includes Emperor's Cup)		Total	
Club	Season	Division	Apps	Goals	Apps	Goals	Apps	Goals	Apps	Goals	Apps	Goals
Vegalta Sendai	2018	J1 League	0	0	1	0	–		0	0	1	0
SC Sagamihara	2023	J3 League	0	0	0	0	–		0	0	0	0
Career total			0	0	1	0	0	0	0	0	1	0
