= Uragami Munekage =

Japanese samurai

Head of Urakami Clan
- In office 1545–1574
- Preceded by: ???
- Succeeded by: Ukita Naoie

Personal details
- Born: 1511 Bizen Province
- Died: 1574 (aged 63-64), Tenjinyama Castle

Military service
- Allegiance: Akamatsu clan
- Rank: Daimyō
- Unit: Urakami clan
- Commands: Tenjinyama castle
- Battles/wars: Siege of Tenjinyama (1574) †

Urakami Munekage (浦上 宗景; 1511 - 1574) was a Japanese samurai and commander of the Sengoku period.

The Urakami clan had been in a position of chief retainer of the Akamatsu clan. After the fall of the Akamatsu clan, Munekage gradually gained power and ruled Bizen, Mimasaka and part of Harima.

Munekage gave Ukita Naoie an important position but the Urakami clan went into decline as Naoie's influence increased. When Munekage arranged an alliance with the Mori clan, Naoie was dissatisfied with the decision and launched a rebellion against Munekage. In the end, his Tenjinyama Castle was attacked and his power was overthrown by Naoie.

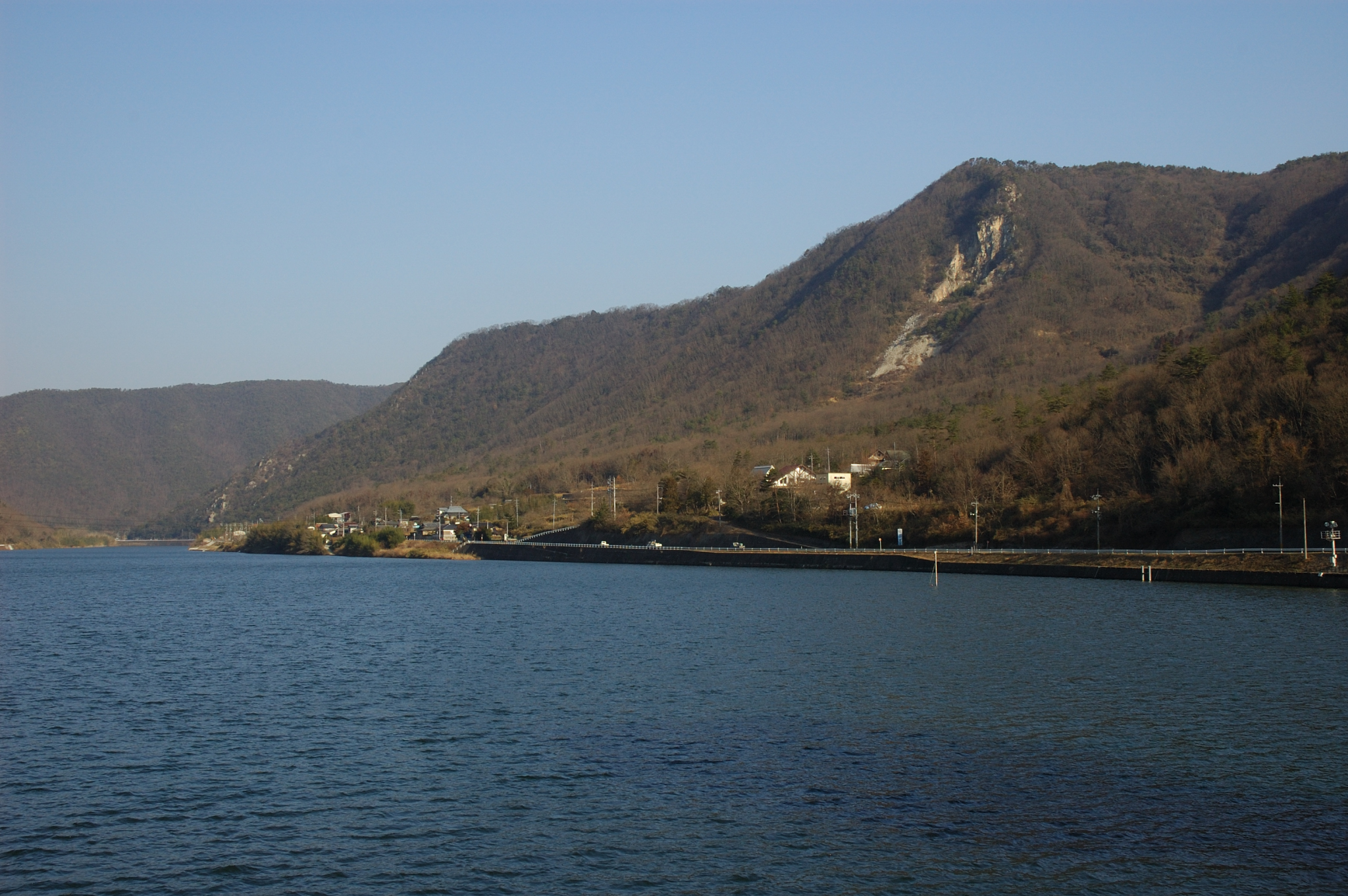
Tenjinyama Castle
