= Wake, Okayama =

Wake 和気町
- Town
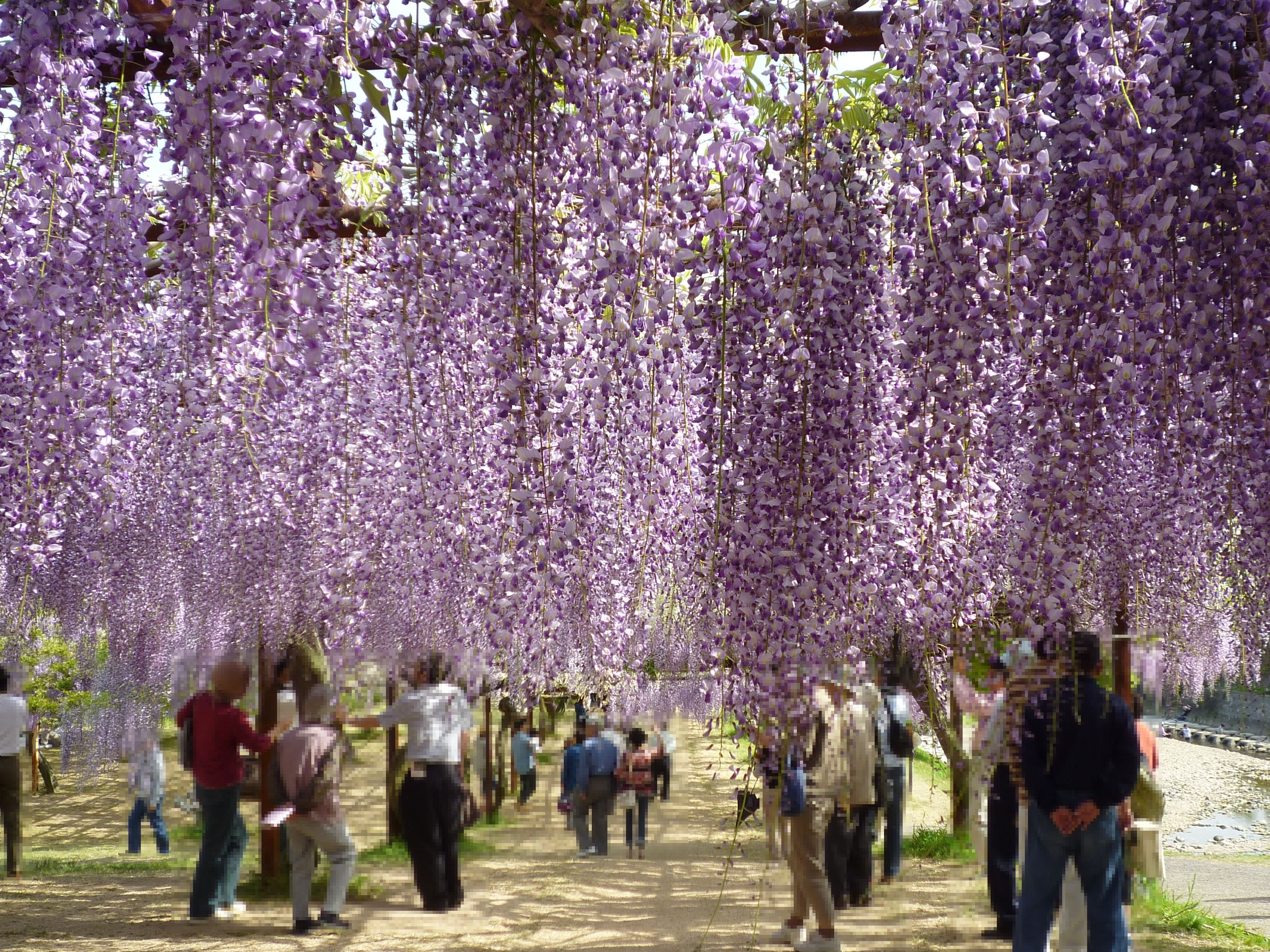
- Wake Fuji Park

- Flag Seal
- Location of Wake in Okayama Prefecture

- Location in Japan
- Coordinates: 34°48′10″N 134°9′27″E
- Country: Japan
- Region: Chūgoku; San'yō
- Prefecture: Okayama
- District: Wake

Area
  - Total: 144.21 km^{2} (55.68 sq mi)

Population (March 31, 2021)
  - Total: 13,833
  - Density: 95.923/km^{2} (248.44/sq mi)
- Time zone: UTC+09:00 (JST)
- City hall address: 555 Shakusho, Wake-cho, Wake-gun, Okayama-ken 709-0495
- Climate: Cfa
- Website: Official website
- Symbols
- Flower: Wisteria floribunda
- Tree: Sakura

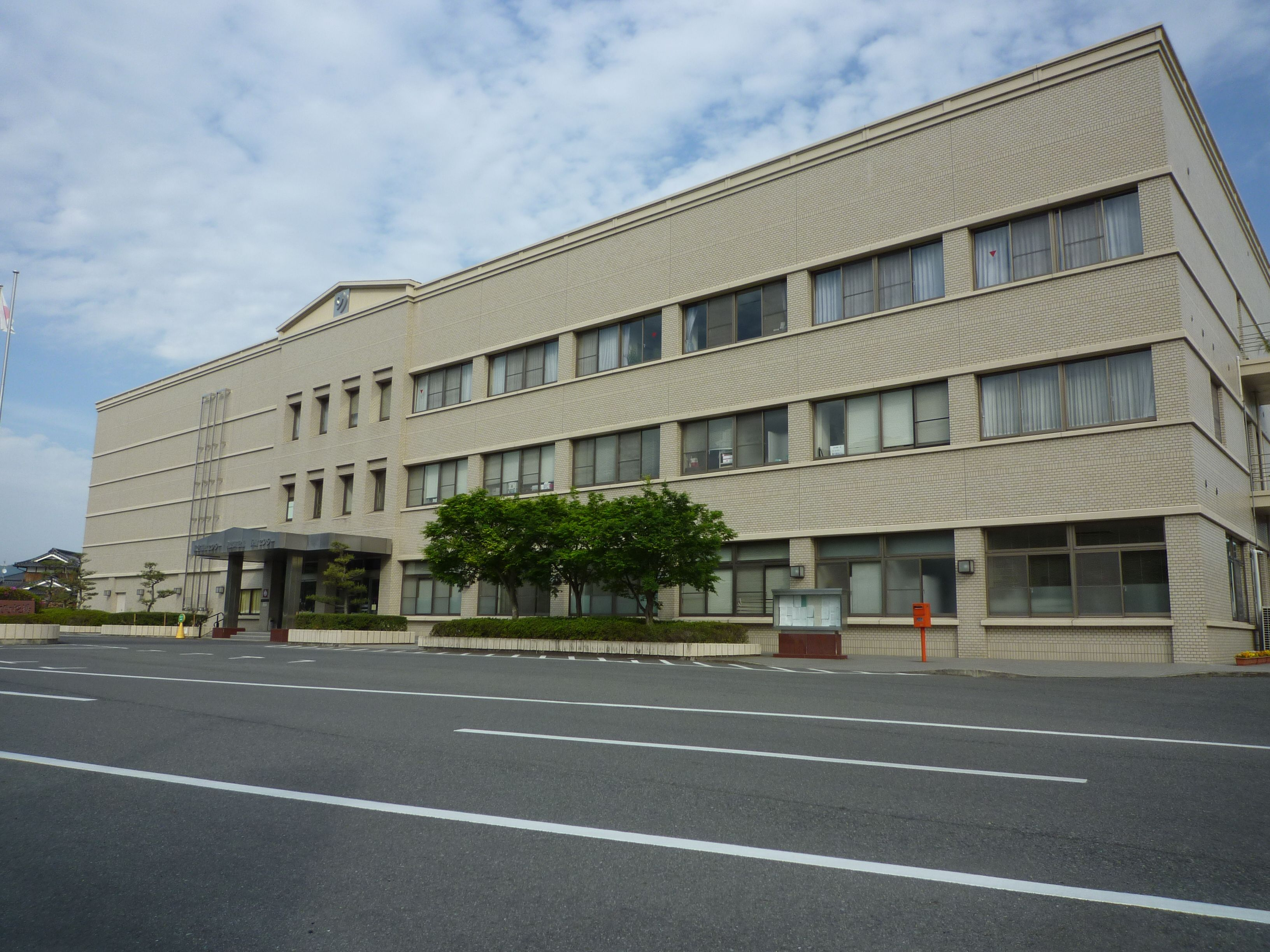
WakeTown Hall

Wake (和気町, Wake-chō) is a town located in Wake District, Okayama Prefecture, Japan. As of 31 March 2022, the town had an estimated population of 13,833 in 6,353 households and a population density of 96 persons per km^{2}. The total area of the town is 144.21 square kilometres (55.68 sq mi). The town is famous in the region for the 'Wamojiyaki' festival that takes place every year on August 15 during the Obon period, and the town is also home to the largest Wisteria park in Japan.

== Geography ==
Wake is located in southeastern Okayama Prefecture. The Yoshii River and the Kongo River flow through the town, which is largely covered by hills and forests.The center of the town forms a small basin at the point where the Yoshii River and the Kongo River meet.

=== Adjoining municipalities ===
Okayama Prefecture

- Akaiwa
- Bizen
- Mimasaka
- Misaki

=== Climate ===
Wake has a humid subtropical climate (Köppen climate classification Cfa). The average annual temperature in Wake is 14.2 °C (57.6 °F). The average annual rainfall is 1,208.1 mm (47.56 in) with July as the wettest month. The temperatures are highest on average in August, at around 26.5 °C (79.7 °F), and lowest in January, at around 2.9 °C (37.2 °F). The highest temperature ever recorded in Wake was 37.9 °C (100.2 °F) on 8 August 2016; the coldest temperature ever recorded was −10.6 °C (12.9 °F) on 9 January 2021.

Climate data for Wake (1991−2020 normals, extremes 1979−present)
Month	Jan	Feb	Mar	Apr	May	Jun	Jul	Aug	Sep	Oct	Nov	Dec	Year
Record high °C (°F)	16.4 (61.5)	21.9 (71.4)	24.6 (76.3)	29.5 (85.1)	33.1 (91.6)	36.5 (97.7)	37.4 (99.3)	37.9 (100.2)	37.0 (98.6)	31.5 (88.7)	26.2 (79.2)	20.9 (69.6)	37.9 (100.2)
Mean daily maximum °C (°F)	9.0 (48.2)	10.1 (50.2)	13.8 (56.8)	19.6 (67.3)	24.3 (75.7)	27.1 (80.8)	30.6 (87.1)	32.1 (89.8)	28.3 (82.9)	22.9 (73.2)	17.0 (62.6)	11.4 (52.5)	20.5 (68.9)
Daily mean °C (°F)	2.9 (37.2)	3.7 (38.7)	7.0 (44.6)	12.4 (54.3)	17.5 (63.5)	21.6 (70.9)	25.6 (78.1)	26.5 (79.7)	22.4 (72.3)	16.1 (61.0)	10.1 (50.2)	4.9 (40.8)	14.2 (57.6)
Mean daily minimum °C (°F)	−2.4 (27.7)	−2.0 (28.4)	0.6 (33.1)	5.4 (41.7)	10.9 (51.6)	16.8 (62.2)	21.6 (70.9)	22.2 (72.0)	17.7 (63.9)	10.7 (51.3)	4.3 (39.7)	−0.4 (31.3)	8.8 (47.8)
Record low °C (°F)	−10.6 (12.9)	−9.3 (15.3)	−7.2 (19.0)	−3.8 (25.2)	−0.5 (31.1)	5.7 (42.3)	12.5 (54.5)	13.9 (57.0)	5.3 (41.5)	−0.9 (30.4)	−3.6 (25.5)	−7.8 (18.0)	−10.6 (12.9)
Average precipitation mm (inches)	37.9 (1.49)	45.4 (1.79)	86.9 (3.42)	96.1 (3.78)	122.5 (4.82)	162.6 (6.40)	189.5 (7.46)	112.2 (4.42)	156.8 (6.17)	98.6 (3.88)	55.9 (2.20)	46.6 (1.83)	1,208.1 (47.56)
Average precipitation days (≥ 1.0 mm)	5.4	6.6	8.9	9.3	9.4	11.3	10.4	8.1	9.4	7.5	5.9	5.7	97.9
Mean monthly sunshine hours	142.2	142.3	179.6	201.5	211.1	154.5	169.8	212.9	161.3	175.0	152.9	148.3	2,051.5
Source: Japan Meteorological Agency

=== Demographics ===
Per Japanese census data, the population of Wake in 2020 is 13,623 people. Wake has been conducting censuses since 1920.

Historical population
Year	Pop.	±%
1920	16,404	—
1925	16,745	+2.1%
1930	17,564	+4.9%
1935	16,755	−4.6%
1940	16,510	−1.5%
1945	21,949	+32.9%
1950	21,995	+0.2%
1955	21,637	−1.6%
1960	20,586	−4.9%
1965	19,009	−7.7%
1970	17,945	−5.6%
1975	18,385	+2.5%
1980	19,088	+3.8%
1985	18,827	−1.4%
1990	17,841	−5.2%
1995	17,227	−3.4%
2000	16,815	−2.4%
2005	16,180	−3.8%
2010	15,362	−5.1%
2015	14,412	−6.2%
2020	13,623	−5.5%
Wake population statistics

== History ==
The Wake area is part of ancient Bizen Province. The important Nara period official Wake no Kiyomaro is from this area. During the Edo Period, it was part of the holdings of Okayama Domain. Following the Meiji restoration, the village of Wake was established within Wake District, Okayama with the creation of the modern municipalities system on April 1, 1889. It was raised to town status on February 6, 1901. On March 1, 2006 Wake was officially merged with the neighboring town of Saeki, also from Wake District. The newly merged town retains the name 'Wake'.

== Government ==
Wake has a mayor-council form of government with a directly elected mayor and a unicameral city council of 12 members. Wake, collectively with the city of Bizen, contributes two members to the Okayama Prefectural Assembly. In terms of national politics, the town is part of the Okayama 1st district of the lower house of the Diet of Japan.

== Economy ==
The economy of Wake is based agriculture and food processing, and the cultivation of fruit trees such as grapes, apples, plums, and cherries.

== Education ==
Wake has three public elementary schools and two public junior high schools operated by the city government, and one public high school operated by the Okayama prefectural Board of Education.

== Transportation ==
=== Railway ===
JR West (JR West) - San'yō Main Line

- Wake

=== Highways ===
- San'yō Expressway
- National Route 374

== Sister cities ==
- Jiading District, Shanghai, China, since July 31, 1989
- Hanna, Alberta, Canada, since March 31, 1993
