= Shoi Yoshinaga =

Japanese footballer

Shoi Yoshinaga 吉永 昇偉
Personal information
- Date of birth: 18 April 2000 (age 26)
- Place of birth: Ōmiya, Saitama, Japan
- Height: 1.75 m (5 ft 9 in)
- Position: Defender

Team information
- Current team: Tegevajaro Miyazaki
- Number: 36

Youth career
- –2019: Omiya Ardija

Senior career*
Years	Team	Apps	(Gls)
2019–2023	Omiya Ardija	27	(1)
2021	→ Thespakusatsu Gunma (loan)	21	(0)
2023	→ Ehime FC (loan)	0	(0)
2024–	Tegevajaro Miyazaki	0	(0)

International career^{‡}
2018	Japan U18	2	(0)
- * Club domestic league appearances and goals as of 28 December 2022, 11:43 (UTC) ‡ National team caps and goals as of 28 March 2021, 17:04 (UTC)

Shoi Yoshinaga (吉永 昇偉, Yoshinaga Shōi; born 18 April 2000) is a Japanese footballer currently playing as a defender for Tegevajaro Miyazaki.

== Career ==
Yoshinaga begin first professional career with Omiya Ardija from 2019.

Yoshinaga was loaned out to Thespakusatsu Gunma in 2021.

Yoshinaga loaned again to Ehime FC from 2023 season.

== Career statistics ==
=== Club ===
As of the end 2022 season.

Club	Season	League			National Cup		League Cup		Other		Total	
Club	Season	Division	Apps	Goals	Apps	Goals	Apps	Goals	Apps	Goals	Apps	Goals
Omiya Ardija	2019	J2 League	13	1	2 (Note: Appearances in the Emperor's Cup)	0	0	0	0	0	15	1
Omiya Ardija	2020	J2 League	3	0	0	0	0	0	0	0	3	0
Omiya Ardija	2022	J2 League	11	0	2	0	0	0	0	0	13	0
Omiya Ardija	Total		27	1	4	0	0	0	0	0	31	1
Thespakusatsu Gunma (loan)	2021	J2 League	21	0	3	0	0	0	0	0	24	0
Ehime FC (loan)	2023	J3 League	0	0	0	0	0	0	0	0	0	0
Ehime FC (loan)	Total		21	0	3	0	0	0	0	0	24	0
Career total			48	1	7	0	0	0	0	0	55	1
