= Yoshinaga, Okayama =

Dissolved municipality in Okayama prefecture, Japan

Yoshinaga (吉永町, Yoshinaga-chō) was a town located in Wake District, Okayama Prefecture, Japan.

As of 2003, the town had an estimated population of 5,254 and a density of 59.27 persons per km^{2}. The total area was 88.65 km^{2}.

On March 22, 2005, Yoshinaga, along with the town of Hinase (also from Wake District), was merged into the expanded city of Bizen.
