= Saidaiji Station =

Railway station in Okayama, Japan

Saidaiji Station 西大寺駅
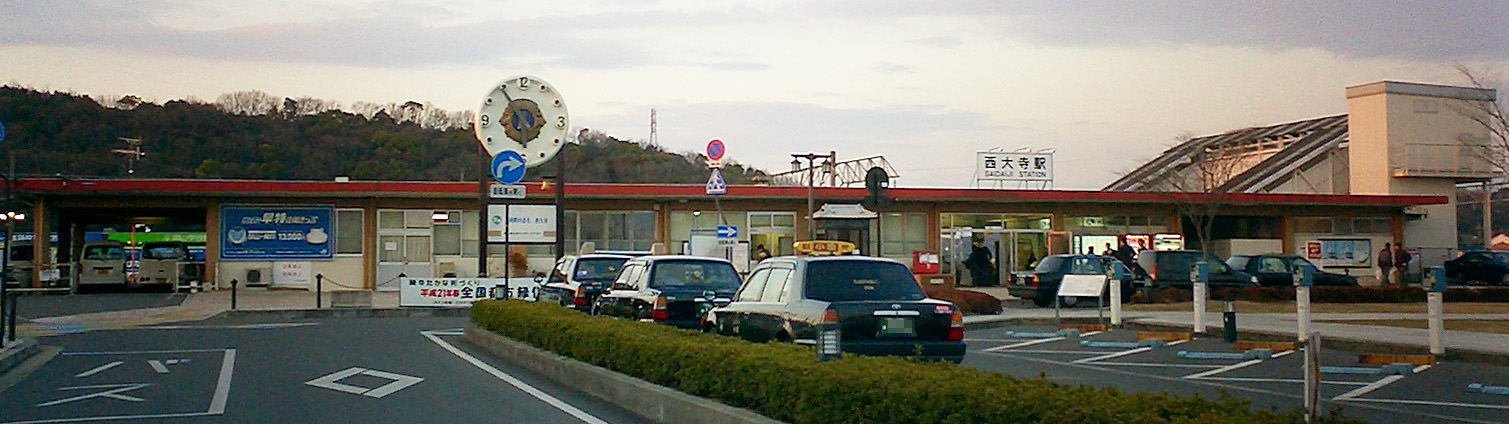
- Saidaiji Station in September 2009

General information
- Location: 2 Chome-4-64 Saidaijikami, Higashi-ku, Okayama-shi, Okayama-ken 704-8112; Japan
- Coordinates: 34°39′42.45″N 134°2′14.0″E
- Owner: West Japan Railway Company
- Operator: West Japan Railway Company
- Line: N Akō Line
- Distance: 51.2 km (31.8 miles) from Aioi
- Platforms: 1 side + 1 island platform
- Tracks: 1
- Connections: Bus stop

Other information
- Status: Unstaffed
- Station code: JR-N06
- Website: Official website

History
- Opened: 1 September 1962

Passengers
- FY2019: 3631 daily
Location
- Location within Okayama Prefecture Location within Japan

Saidaiji Station (西大寺駅, Saidaiji-eki) is a passenger railway station located in Higashi-ku in the city of Okayama, Okayama Prefecture, Japan. It is operated by the West Japan Railway Company (JR West).

== Lines ==
Saidaiji Station is served by the JR Akō Line, and is located 51.2 kilometers from the terminus of the line at Aioi and 47.0 kilometers from Banshū-Akō.

== Station layout ==
The station consists of one side platform and one island platform connected by a footbridge. The station is staffed.

== Adjacent stations ==
«	Service	»
JR West Akō Line
Ōdomi	-	Ōdara

== History ==
Saidaiji Station was opened on 1 September 1962. With the privatization of Japanese National Railways (JNR) on 1 April 1987, the station came under the control of JR West.

== Passenger statistics ==
In fiscal 2019, the station was used by an average of 3631 passengers daily

== Surrounding area ==
- Okayama City Higashi Ward Office
- Okayama Municipal Saidaiji Elementary School
- Okayama Prefectural Saidaiji High School

== See also ==
- List of railway stations in Japan
