= Wake Station =

Railway station in Wake, Okayama Prefecture, Japan

Wake Station 和気駅
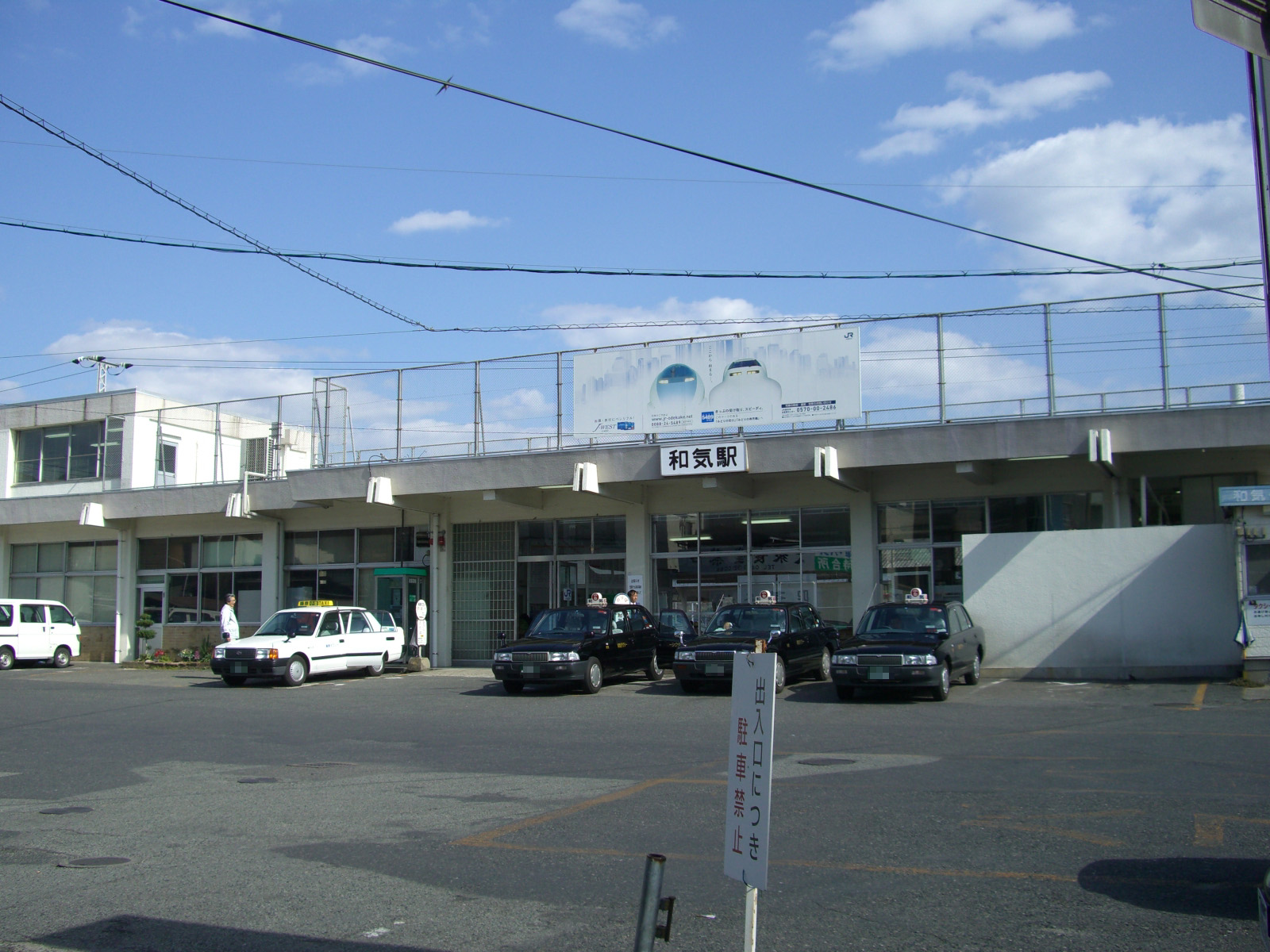
- Wake Station in April 2007

General information
- Location: 572-9 Fukutomi, Wake-cho, Wake-gun, Okayama-ken 709-0442; Japan
- Coordinates: 34°47′50.32″N 134°9′9.42″E
- Owner: West Japan Railway Company
- Operator: West Japan Railway Company
- Line: S San'yō Main Line
- Distance: 114.8 km (71.3 miles) from Kobe
- Platforms: 1 side + 1 island platform
- Tracks: 3
- Connections: Bus stop

Other information
- Status: Staffed
- Station code: JR-S09
- Website: Official website

History
- Opened: 18 March 1891

Passengers
- FY2019: 1355 daily

Services
Preceding station	JR West	Following station
Kumayama towards Okayama	San'yō Line Local	Yoshinaga towards Mitsuishi
Location
- Location within Okayama Prefecture Location within Japan

Wake Station (和気駅, Wake-eki) is a passenger railway station located in the town of Wake, Okayama Prefecture, Japan, operated by the West Japan Railway Company (JR West).

== Lines ==
Wake Station is served by the JR San'yō Main Line, and is located 114.8 kilometers from the terminus of the line at Kobe.

== Station layout ==
The station consists of one side platform and one island platform connected by a footbridge. The station building is located on the side of Platform 1. The station is staffed.

=== Platforms ===
1	■ S San'yō Main Line	for Aioi and Himeji
2, 3	■ S San'yō Main Line	for Okayama and Mihara

== History ==
Wake Station was opened on 18 March 1891. With the privatization of Japanese National Railways (JNR) on 1 April 1987, the station came under the control of JR West.

== Passenger statistics ==
In fiscal 2019, the station was used by an average of 1355 passengers daily

== Surrounding area ==
- Wake Town Hall
- Okayama Prefectural Wake Shizutani High School

== See also ==
- List of railway stations in Japan
