= Mitsuishi Station (Okayama) =

Railway station in Bizen, Okayama Prefecture, Japan

Mitsuishi Station 三石駅
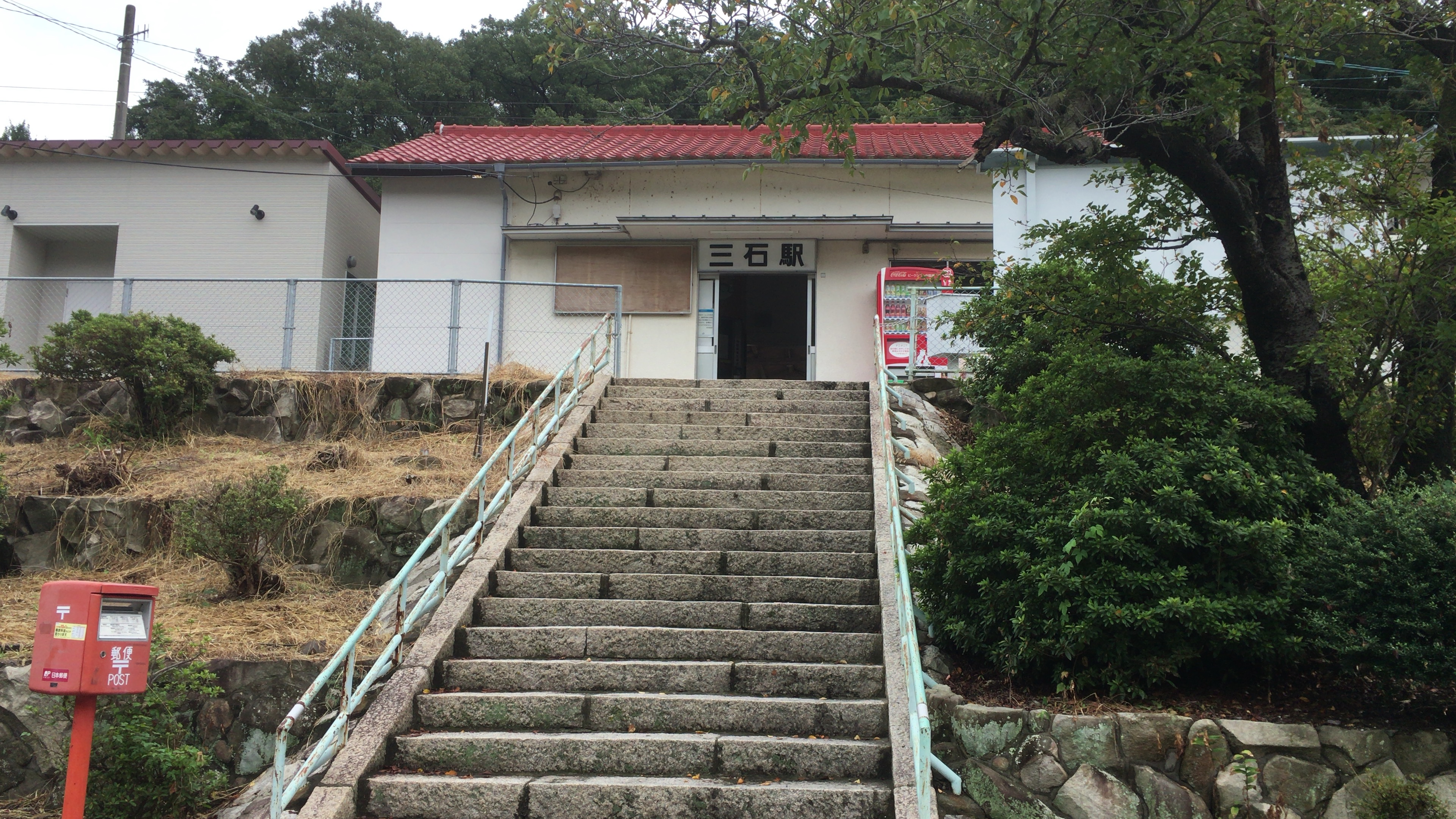
- Mitsuishi Station in September 2019

General information
- Location: 3168 Mitsuishi, Bizen-shi, Okayama-ken 705-0132; Japan
- Coordinates: 34°48′16.30″N 134°16′31.53″E
- Owner: West Japan Railway Company
- Operator: West Japan Railway Company
- Line: S San'yō Main Line
- Distance: 102.4 km (63.6 miles) from Kobe
- Platforms: 1 island platform
- Tracks: 2
- Connections: Bus stop

Other information
- Status: Unstaffed
- Station code: JR-S11
- Website: Official website

History
- Opened: 1 December 1890

Passengers
- FY2019: 174 daily

Services
Preceding station	JR West	Following station
Yoshinaga towards Okayama	San'yō Line Local	Kamigōri Terminus
Location
- Location within Okayama Prefecture Location within Japan

Mitsuishi Station (三石駅, Mitsuishi-eki) is a passenger railway station located in the city of Bizen, Okayama Prefecture, Japan, operated by the West Japan Railway Company (JR West).

== Lines ==
Mitsuishi Station is served by the JR San'yō Main Line, and is located 102.4 kilometers from the terminus of the line at Kobe.

== Station layout ==
The station consists of one ground-level island platform located on an embankment. The station building is located directly on the platform, which is connected to the road by stairs and a level crossing. The station is unattended.

=== Platforms ===
1	■ S San'yō Main Line	for Aioi and Himeji
2	■ S San'yō Main Line	for Okayama and Mihara

== History ==
Mitsuishi Station was opened on 1 December 1890. With the privatization of Japanese National Railways (JNR) on 1 April 1987, the station came under the control of JR West.

== Passenger statistics ==
In fiscal 2019, the station was used by an average of 174 passengers daily

== Surrounding area ==
- Bizen City Mitsuishi Branch Office
- Bizen Municipal Mitsuishi Junior High School
- Bizen Municipal Mitsuishi Elementary School

== See also ==
- List of railway stations in Japan
