= Bizen pottery kiln ruins =

Remains of pottery kilns in Bizen, Okayama, Japan

- 備前陶器窯跡 (Japanese)
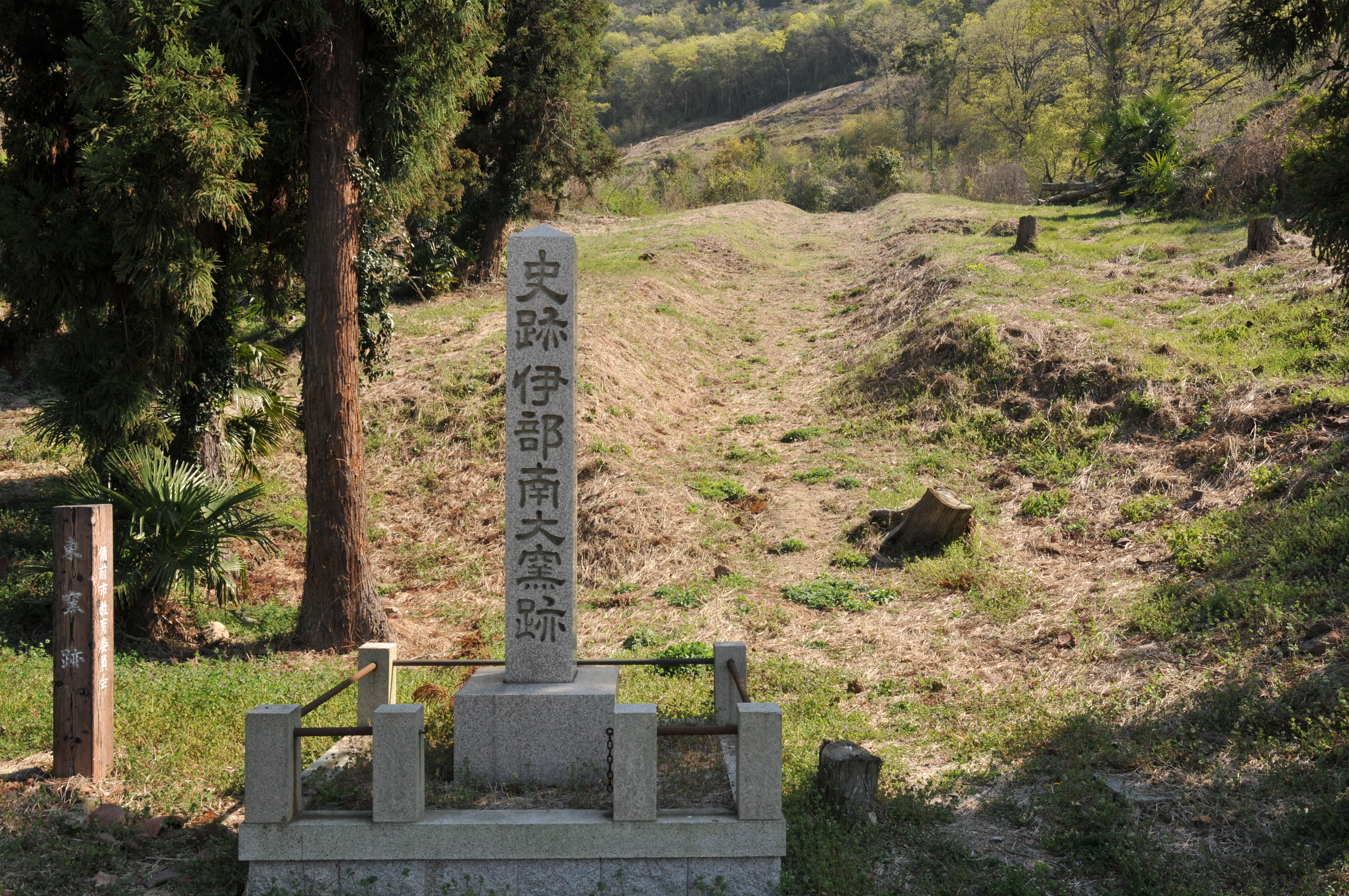
- Inbe Minami Ogama ruins

- Bizen pottery kiln ruins Bizen pottery kiln ruins (Japan)
- 34°44′11″N 134°09′36″E
- Periods: Kamakura - Edo period
- Location: Bizen, Okayama, Japan
- Region: San'yō region

Site notes
- Public access: Yes
- National Historic Site of Japan

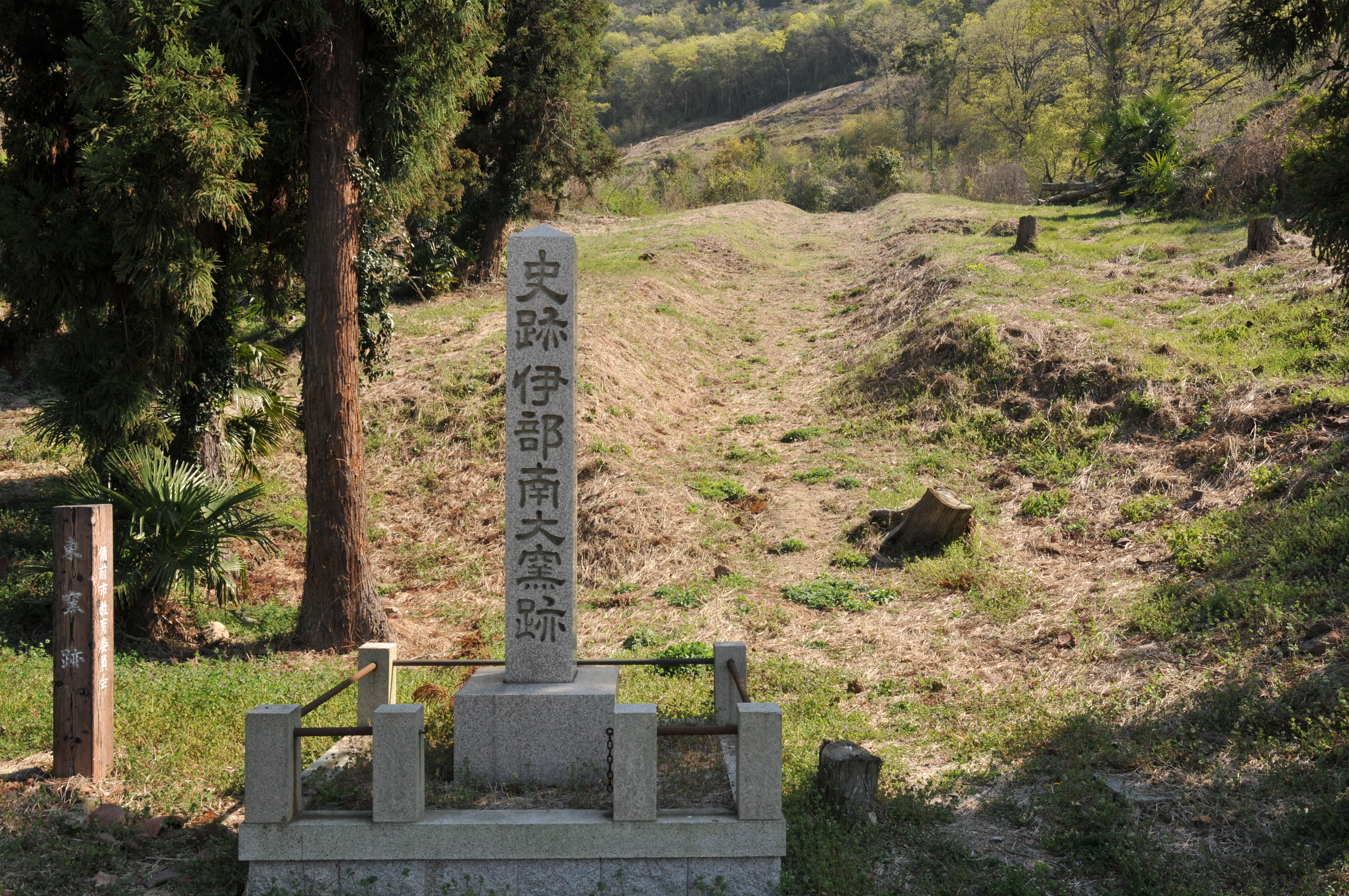
Inbe Minami-Ogama site（east kiln）

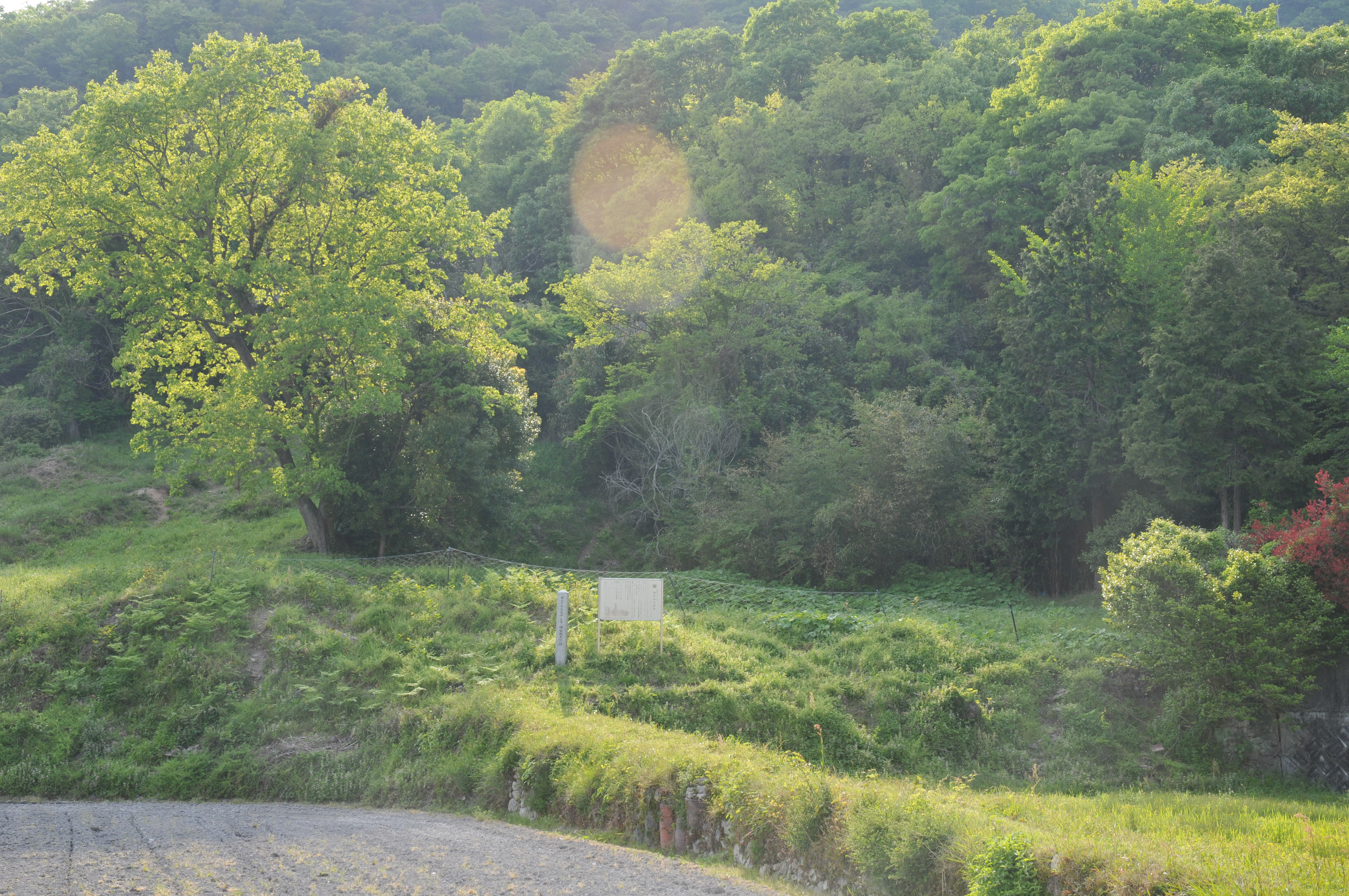
Inbe Nishi-Ogama site

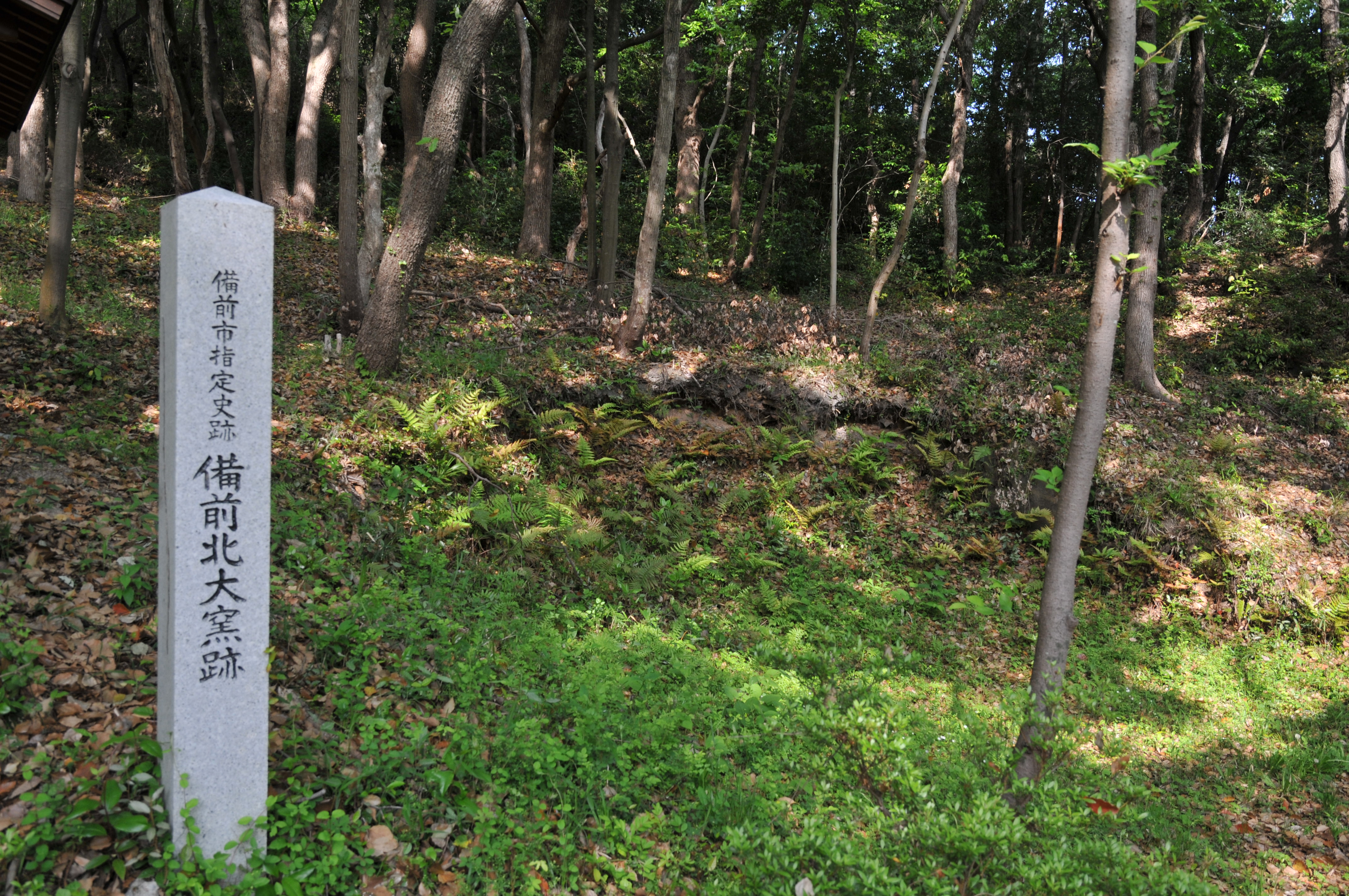
Inbe Kita-Ogama site

Bizen pottery kiln ruins (備前陶器窯跡, Bizen tōki kama ato) is an archaeological site consisting of the remains of kilns for firing Bizen ware pottery from the end of the Muromachi period to the Edo period located in the Imbe neighborhood of the city of Bizen, Okayama Prefecture, in the San'yo region of Japan. The site is divided into three locations: The Inbe Minami-Ogama site, Inbe Nishi-Ogama site and the Inbe Kita-Ogama site. The Inbe Minami-Ogama site has been protected by the central government as a National Historic Site since 1959, and the other two sites were added in 2009.

== Overview ==
Bizen ware has ties to Sue pottery from the Heian period in the 6th century, and made its appearance during the Kamakura period of the 14th century, when changes in lifestyles have led to a demand for hard, durable and practical pottery for everyday use. Bizen was considered one of the Six Ancient Kilns by the scholar Koyama Fujio. Until the construction of the large kilns, small kilns were scattered throughout the mountains of Uraibe and Kumayama areas of former Bizen Province. However, as the popularity of Bizen ware increased, large kilns were built to meet the need for mass production from the late Muromachi period. The rustic taste of Bizen ware came to be prized in the Japanese tea ceremony that flourished in the Momoyama period, and the large kilns reached their peak during the Momoyama period and the early Edo period. During the Edo period, the Ikeda clan daimyo of Okayama Domain continued to support the kilns and gave special privileges to families who operated them. However, after the middle of the Edo period, ceramics began to be fired all over the country, and the sales of Bizen ware gradually declined, eliminating the need for mass production. From the mid-Edo period onwards, maintenance of the kilns became an increasing burden and by the Tenpō era (1830-1843) in the latter part of the Edo period, the large kilns were abandoned in favor of smaller and more economic kilns.

== Inbe Minami-Ogama site ==
The Inbe Minami-Ogama site (伊部南大窯跡) is located at the northern foot of Mount Kayabara, approximately 200 meters south of Inbe Station on the JR West Ako Line. It consists of three kilns: the east kiln, the central kiln, and the west kiln, along with a midden where damaged items and kiln tools have been discarded. The east kiln is the largest kiln in Japan, with a total length of 54 meters and a width of 5 meters. The central kiln is about 30 meters long and 2.3 meters wide. The west kiln is about 31 meters long and 2.8 meters wide. The kilns have a noborigama tunnel structure with an arched ceiling extending up the slope of the mountain. These kilns were used to mass-produce pots, jars, sake bottles, mortars, and other daily items. The amount of firewood required for one firing was up to 60 tons, and the kilns could fire 34,000 to 35,000 items at one time.

Further west of the west kiln is the site of the Tenpō kiln, which was built around 1840 and was in operation until around 1885–1886. Approximately 18.5 meters long and 4.5 meters wide. In addition, a small Heian period kiln with a total length of about 4 to 5 meters and a width of less than 1 meter was found at an elevation of 70 meters halfway up the mountain.

The site was designated as a national historic site on May 13, 1959.

== Inbe Nishi-Ogama site ==
The Inbe Nishi-Ogama site (伊部西大窯跡) is located at the eastern foot of Mount Iou, about 600 meters northwest of Inbe Station. Currently, the traces of three kilns have been confirmed, the largest of which is about 40 meters long and about 4 meters wide. Similar to the Minami Ogama site, the kilns at this site mainly produced miscellaneous daily wares such as vases, jars, sake bottles, and mortars. On March 21, 1976, it was designated as a Bizen City Historic Site, and on February 12, 2009, it became part of the National Historic Site.

== Inbe Kita-Ogama site ==
The Inbe Kita-Ogama site (伊部北大窯跡) is located about 300 meters north of Inbe Station, at the southern foot of Mount Furo, around Inbe Shrine. Currently, traces of four kilns have been identified. One (approximately 45 meters long and 4.7 meters wide) is separated by the road leading from Amatsu Shrine to Inbe Shrine. This kiln is presumed to have been built in the Momoyama period. The other three are built parallel to the northwest slope of Inbe Shrine. The north-westernmost kiln is confirmed to be about 47 meters long and 5.4 meters wide, and it is known from historical documents that this kiln existed during the Ōei era (1394-1427) in the early Muromachi period. However, among the excavated items, no items before the latter half of the Muromachi period have been found. As with the Inbe Minami-Ogama and Inbe Nishi-Ogama kilns, the Inbe Kita-Ogama mainly produced miscellaneous daily wares. The kiln remained in operation into the mid-Edo period; however when it needed repairs in 1720, it was not possible to raise the necessary funding, and the kiln was reduced in size to a third of its original length. On October 6, 1971, it was designated as a Bizen City Historic Site, and on February 12, 2009, it became part of the National Historic Site.

== See also ==
- List of Historic Sites of Japan (Okayama)
