= Imbe =

Imbe may refer to:

- Imbe (tree), a fruit tree native to Africa
- Imbe, Okayama, a township in Japan
  - Imbe Station
- Imbé, a municipality in Rio Grande do Sul, Brazil
- Imbé de Minas, a municipality in Minas Gerais, Brazil
- Imbé River, a river in Rio de Janeiro, Brazil
- Improved multi-band excitation, or IMBE, a speech coding standard
