= List of Twin Star Exorcists episodes =

Cover art of the first Blu-ray compilation released by Avex Pictures on March 31, 2017 in Japan; the characters featured on the cover are Rokuro Enmado and Benio Adashino.

Twin Star Exorcists is an anime series produced by Pierott based on the manga series of the same name by Yoshiaki Sukeno. The series was broadcast between April 6, 2016, and March 29, 2017, on TV Tokyo and other TX Network stations, and later on AT-X. The first twenty episodes are adapted from the manga's storyline, but beginning with episode 21, the series diverges into an original story.

The series' first opening theme song is "Valkyrie -Ikusa Otome-" (Valkyrie -戦乙女-; lit. "Valkyrie -War Maiden-") by Wagakki Band, while the first ending theme is "Eyes" (アイズ, Aizu) by Hitomi Kaji. The second opening theme, "Re:Call", is performed by the idol group i☆Ris, while the second ending theme, "Yadori-boshi" (宿り星) is performed by the two-man group Itowokashi (Kashitarō Itō and Ryō Miyada). The third opening theme, "sync" is performed by lol the music director, while the third ending theme "Hide & Seek" is performed by Girlfriend. The fourth opening theme, "Kanadeai" is performed by Itowokashi, while the fourth ending theme "Hotarubi" is performed by Wagakki Band.

== Episode list ==
No.	Title	Directed by	Written by	Storyboarded by	Original release date
1	"The Destined Two – Boy Meets Girl"; Transliteration: "Unmei no Futari BOY MEETS GIRL" (Japanese: 運命の二人 BOY MEETS GIRL)	Mitsutaka Noshitani, Tomohisa Taguchi, Tatsuya Igarashi	Naruhisa Arakawa	Tomohisa Taguchi	April 6, 2016
In Kyoto, Benio Adashino prepares for her trip to Tokyo, while her guardian Kinu warns her of rumors about an exorcist with power equal to or greater than hers. She boards a train in Yokohama, only for it to be attacked by Kegare. After entering the spirit world Magano, she manages to defeat them at the cost of depleting all her strength. Meanwhile, after Rokuro Enmado, an aspiring yet neglectful exorcist runs away from his friend Ryogo's attempt to have him participate in an exorcism, he witnesses Benio suddenly appear and fall from the sky. He catches her and they both fall into a river. After they become lost while following her map, a Kegare attacks two children. Benio follows it to Magano, and Rokuro is pulled in with her. She easily defeats the monster, but a great many more appear. While fighting a gigantic Kegare, her Exorcist Enchantments lose their power. Rokuro faces the monster and removes an enchantment from his arm, transforming it and allowing him to destroy the Kegare with a single strike. After the credits, a mysterious long-haired man declares that Rokuro and Benio are the "Twin Star Exorcists".
2	"Intersection of Twin Stars – A Fateful Fight"; Transliteration: "Sōsei Kōsa A FATEFUL FIGHT" (Japanese: 双星交差 A FATEFUL FIGHT)	Matsuo Asami	Naruhisa Arakawa	Akitoshi, Jun Kamiya	April 13, 2016
After the battle with the Kegare, Rokuro and Benio immediately take a disliking to each other. Rokuro is shocked when he returns to the Seika Dormitory and finds that Benio will be living there. The next morning, Arima Tsuchimikado, the leader of all exorcists, arrives and order all the regional leaders be assembled in the Five Mirror Chamber. Once they are assembled, he announces that he has received a prophecy revealing the identity of the Miko, the strongest exorcist who will cleanse all Kegare. He then asks Benio and Rokuro to step forward and commands them to fight, tricking Rokuro into the battle by belittling his dead friends. Rokuro is forced to go all out as Benio attacks him. Just as the two are about to injure each other, Arima stops the fight by cancelling out their enchantments, and apologizes to Rokuro for insulting his friends. He then reveals what the prophecy told him: Rokuro and Benio are the Twin Star Exorcists, destined to marry and give birth to the Miko.
3	"Differing Intentions – A Hero's Worth"; Transliteration: "Surechigai A HERO'S WORTH" (Japanese: すれ違い A HERO'S WORTH)	Shigeki Hatakeyama	Keiichirō Ōchi	Shigenori Kageyama, Yukihiro Matsushita	April 20, 2016
Rokuro awakens from a nightmare of being married to Benio. Before leaving for an exorcism, Ryogo tells him to help Benio now that she has transferred to his school. Rokuro is displeased to learn that she will be in the same class as him. When Ryogo and his group run into trouble during their exorcism, Benio leaves to assist them. After school, noting that Rokuro has been acting depressed, his childhood friend Mayura Otomi decides to take him to an amusement park. The giant Kegare that Benio is fighting smashes into the park's roller coaster, leaving two children dangling precariously in one of the cars. Benio slays the monster, and Rokuro saves the two boys just as the car plunges from the track. On the way home, Mayura tells Rokuro that it is at times like this that he is cool.
4	"The Sound of Magano – Bothersome Twosome"; Transliteration: "Magano no Oto BOTHERSOME TWOSOME" (Japanese: 禍野の音 BOTHERSOME TWOSOME)	migmi	Katsura Murayama	Jun Kamiya, Tomohisa Taguchi	April 27, 2016
Late one evening, Ryogo confides in Benio how he wishes Rokuro would return to being an exorcist. The next morning, Rokuro and Ryogo have an altercation just before the latter leaves for an exorcism. Arriving at the house they are to exorcise, where eleven people have disappeared over time, Ryogo, Shinnosuke, and Atsushi find a room brimming with malevolent energy. Entering Magano, they encounter a gigantic, two-headed Kegare, which knocks Shinnosuke and Atsushi back through the gate, leaving Ryogo stranded. Exhausted, they return to the dorm and tell Rokuro what happened, forcing him to beg Benio for help in rescuing his friend. Ryogo, out of the gate talismans that would allow him to escape Magano, is being brutally beaten by the two-headed Kegare. Just as he is about to be eaten, Rokuro arrive and punches the monster, saving him. Benio joins them to help fight off a swarm of smaller Kegare, allowing Rokuro to deliver the killing blow to the two-headed one. He apologizes to Ryogo for their fight that morning, and they return to the dorm. While Shinnosuke and Atsushi take Ryogo to the hospital, Rokuro stays behind to thank Benio.
5	"Twelve Guardians, Vermilion Bird – The Guardian Shimon"; Transliteration: "Jūniten Shō Suzaku THE GUARDIAN SHIMON" (Japanese: 十二天将 朱雀 THE GUARDIAN SHIMON)	Takashi Imanishi	Yoshimi Narita	Takashi Imanishi	May 4, 2016
In Kyoto, Arima dispatches a new and mysterious exorcist to Rokuro's home city of Narukami to investigate the increase in Kegare appearances. Meanwhile, Rokuro begins to reconsider his decision of abandoning exorcism after visiting Ryogo in the hospital. After receiving a report of twenty Kegare appearing, Benio, Rokuro, and the others from the dorm find that a group of elementary school children have been taken. Encountering an overwhelming number of Kegare, they succeed in saving the children, but find themselves facing a dire situation until the exorcist from Kyoto arrives. He easily destroys the Kegare and reveals himself to be Shimon Ikaruga, the youngest of the Twelve Guardians, a group consisting of the most powerful of exorcists bearing titles derived from the twelve familiars of Abe no Seimei. Shimon is initially unimpressed by Rokuro, but Benio comes to the latter's defense, holding Shimon back as another Kegare appears, allowing him to witness Rokuro's strength. Shimon detects a strange presence, but is summoned back to Kyoto before he can investigate it. Afterwards, Rokuro realizes that he feels inspired by Shimon.
6	"Benio and Mayura – Girls' Party"; Transliteration: "Benio to Mayura GIRLS' PARTY" (Japanese: 紅緒と繭良 GIRLS' PARTY)	Hiroaki Nishimura	Yasunori Yamada	Yukihiro Matsushita, Kazuo Miyake	May 11, 2016
Mayura begins to worry about Benio after the latter continues to leave school early, thinking that she might be hanging out with gangsters. She begins attempting to get close to her, but they end in failure. Back at the dorm, Rokuro surprises everyone by offering to help with an exorcism since Ryogo has just gotten out of the hospital. The next morning, Ryogo asks Benio to sit out on the day's exorcisms and let Rokuro handle them, so she goes out jogging. She encounters Mayura, and they bond over ohagi, Benio's favorite food. However, as they eat, a fissure to Magano opens outside the building, prompting Benio to open a gate and save a bystander from the Kegare. Upon returning, she finds Mayura anxiously waiting for her. Rokuro returns from the exorcism to find Mayura at the dorm, annoyed that he is living together with Benio. Meanwhile, Jissama finds something troubling in Magano.
7	"A New Trial – Unbelievable Game"; Transliteration: "Aratanaru Shiren UNBELIEVABLE GAME" (Japanese: 新たなる試練 UNBELIEVABLE GAME)	Matsuo Asami	Naruhisa Arakawa	Shigenori Kageyama, Jun Kamiya	May 18, 2016
Arima arrives at the dorm, and informs Rokuro and Benio that it is time for their trial. He brings them to a lavish house and tells them that they are to live in it together, in order to hasten the birth of the Miko. He then takes Benio's familiar Kinako and leaves. As soon as the two go to their rooms, the walls retract and the floor tilts dramatically. Arima appears on the TV, revealing this as their first trial, and instructs them to work together to scale the floor and reach an air vent near the ceiling, which will allow them to access controls to return the rooms to normal. After a number of failed attempts due to improper coordination, they manage to make their way to the top by scaling pieces of furniture affixed to the floor. Making it into the vent, Rokuro receives a call from Atsushi, who tells them that a powerful Kegare has appeared and asks for their help. They find that the only way to restore the rooms and get out is to answer a riddle, which manages Rokuro guesses the answer to. They arrive in Magano in time to help Ryogo and the others defeat the Kegare, but afterwards, Benio finds that one of her treasured hairpin is missing. Rokuro remembers noticing something off since they left the house, and they return there and find it still in the vent. When Rokuro comments on how important it is to her, she tells him that it was given to her by her twin brother, who was killed during a Kegare exorcism after they were separated following their parents' death.
8	"Rokuro's Feelings – Shocking Confession"; Transliteration: "Rokuro no Kimochi SHOCKING CONFESSION" (Japanese: ろくろの気持ち SHOCKING CONFESSION)	Kiyomi Torii	Keiichirō Ōchi	Yoshinori Odaka, Yukihiro Matsushita	May 25, 2016
Mayura arrives at Rokuro and Benio's new villa, where her concern about them living together is soon outweighed by worry when she realizes that Rokuro is going back to being an exorcist. After she leaves, she thinks back to Rokuro renouncing his attempts to become the strongest exorcist after the death of his friends. At the house, Rokuro and Benio find that Mayura dropped a charm meant to conceal her strong spell power from Kegare, who would feed on it. The two pursue her, but are not in time to keep her from being abducted by a Kegare. They rescue her from the monster, but find themselves unable to defeat it until Seigen Amawaka, Mayura's father and Rokuro's mentor; one of the Twelve Guardians, arrives. With the Kegare defeated, he challenges Rokuro to a duel. Meanwhile, Jissama tells Ryogo and the others about Kegare corruption, where an individual with strong spell power can become a Kegare. He reveals that the first incident of this was the Hinatsuki tragedy occurred two years ago, of which Rokuro was the only survivor. Kinu is shocked, and it is revealed that Benio's twin brother was one of the trainees who died when Kegare attacked the Hinatsuki Dormitory. Seigen tells Benio that the official story about the tragedy is false, and the truth is Rokuro killed all the exorcist trainees himself. Benio demands Rokuro tell her if the story is true.
9	"Intertwining Tragedies – Tragedy Comes With Smile"; Transliteration: "Kōsaku Suru Higeki TRAGEDY COMES WITH SMILE" (Japanese: 交錯する悲劇 TRAGEDY COMES WITH SMILE)	Mitsutaka Noshitani	Katsura Murayama	Toshihiko Masuda	June 1, 2016
As Rokuro hears that Benio's twin brother is Yūto Ijika, she starts to berate him with her sword then Seigen intervenes that there's more to the story. At that moment, a cloaked individual approaches and reveal itself to be Yūto. Surprise to see him alive, an enraged Rokuro confronts him but subdues him without use of talismans. Seigen resumes that the Hinatsuki tragedy was caused by cases of Kegare corruption. A flashback from two years, the tenants at Hinatsuki Dormitory attend a ceremony that Yūto set up claiming it will help others get stronger. In reality, the whole ritual was for performing dark arts on all the exorcist trainees for his own test subjects to receive vast spiritual power. As impurity atrocities throughout the dorm and unable to escape the trainees suffer under Kegare transformation while only Rokuro himself suppresses the nightmare. Gaining his Kegare arm in the process, Rokuro forced to put the calamity to rest by exorcising his peers. Since then the tragedy has left a trauma on Rokuro resulting him to abandon the exorcist profession. Back in the present, Benio is severely confused that her once kind brother would commit the tragedy. However, Yūto says he has been deceiving everybody and never actually cared for his family at all. Rokuro runs amok and punches him, while Yūto continually repels him with a similar arm. Seeing the battle getting nowhere, Benio intervenes when Yūto respects Rokuro's potential and then retreats. Returning home, while Seigen takes in Mayura for medical treatment, a pitiful Benio sincerely apologizes to Rokuro of her brother's misdeeds. Rokuro's newfound goal accepts Benio's partnership and the young exorcists together vow to become stronger to resolve Yūto's actions.
10	"Subaru's Training – The Bewitching Guardian"; Transliteration: "Subaru no Shugyō THE BEWITCHING GUARDIAN" (Japanese: すばるの修行 THE BEWITCHING GUARDIAN)	Masayuki Ōzeki	Yoshimi Narita	Jun Kamiya, Kazuo Miyake	June 8, 2016
Rokuro and Benio ask Seigen to help them train, but he refuses. Luckily, Subaru Mitejima, Benio's former master, arrives and agrees to teach them. However, instead of giving them the training they want, she instructs them to do things such as go clothes shopping, hold hands, feed each other, and finally, kiss, at which they balk. After learning that Arima is behind the strange training, they refuse to do anymore. As they pause to eat some ohagi, a breach to Magano opens and they discover a swarm of Kegare trying to break through. As they attempt to exorcise them, however, Rokuro finds that he is unable to control his arm after overexerting it in his fight with Yūto. Benio then exhausts her spell power to return him to normal. Finding themselves surrounded, they are relieved when Subaru arrives to destroy the Kegare and seal the breach. Later, they arrive home to find that she has extensively remodeled their house. When she tells them that the next part of their training will be to work on their "nightly marital activities", Rokuro yells at her to leave.
11	"Do Your Best, Newlyweds – Fantastic Moments"; Transliteration: "Shinkon-san o Kibariyasu FANTASTIC MOMENTS" (Japanese: 新婚さんおきばりやす FANTASTIC MOMENTS)	Takuma Suzuki	Yasunori Yamada	Yukihiro Matsushita	June 15, 2016
Subaru and Tatara, start a game of "hide and seek" with Rokuro and Benio, promising to train them if they manage to find her. The pair then start trailing her around the city in vain until they come across another breach to Magano. Once Rokuro and Benio manage to defeat the Kegare, it was revealed to be a fake by Subaru as she wanted to test the couple's bond and trust in each other.
12	"Give Me a Break – Basara Boy Kamui"; Transliteration: "Kanben Shiroshi BASARA BOY KAMUI" (Japanese: 勘弁しろし BASARA BOY KAMUI)	Akira Shimizu	Katsura Murayama	Shigenori Kageyama	June 22, 2016
Benio has another meeting with Kamui, who is one of the Basara, the strongest of all Kegare, and the culprit who murdered her parents, Hyoga and Saki, six years ago. Despite being eager to have her revenge, Benio finds herself powerless before Kamui, until Rokuro appears to assist her.
13	"Your Courage, My Courage – Zero Millimeters Apart"; Transliteration: "Kimi no Yūki, Watashi no Yūki ZERO MILLIMETERS APART" (Japanese: 君の勇気、私の勇気 ZERO MILLIMETERS APART)	Hiroaki Nishimura	Yoshimi Narita	Jun Kamiya, Kazuo Miyake	July 6, 2016
Kamui proves himself to be too strong for Rokuro and Benio, despite combining together, until they manage to resonate with each other and unleash a powerful attack that takes him by surprise. When the fight ends for now, the awakened Twin Stars find themselves in the sweetheart bedroom, which is most likely Arima's doing.
14	"Yukatas, Stars, and Wishes – Tanabata Special"; Transliteration: "Yukata to Hoshi to Negaigoto TANABATA SPECIAL" (Japanese: 浴衣と星と願い事 TANABATA SPECIAL)	Yoshifumi Sasahara, Shintarō Douge	Keiichirō Ōchi	Tomohisa Taguchi	July 13, 2016
Rokuro and Benio gather at the Seika Dormitory with their friends to celebrate the Tanabata festival, while reminiscing of the events of the series so far.
15	"Goodbye to Being Alone – The Awakening of Love"; Transliteration: "Hitori Bocchi ni Sayōnara THE AWAKENING OF LOVE" (Japanese: ひとりぼっちに さようなら THE AWAKENING OF LOVE)	Hiroshi Tamada	Katsura Murayama	Yukihiro Matsushita	July 20, 2016
Fushihara calls on Ryogo to come meet him at a park. There, Ryogo meets an exorcist who had just applied herself to the Ayame Branch of the Exorcist Union. She introduce herself as Haruka Kaibara who quickly grows attached to Ryogo. One day, Ryogo goes to the day care center where Fushihara works and asks him if it is okay for Ryogo to continue dating Haruka. Fushihara lectures Ryogo about family bonds and whatnot. Later, a death report states that Fushihara had died in Magano. However, the truth is later revealed when Benio and Rokuro battle a Kegare corruption which proved to be Fushihara corrupted.
16	"As an Exorcist – Salvation Then Wailing"; Transliteration: "Onmyōji Toshite SALVATION THEN WAILING" (Japanese: 陰陽師として SALVATION THEN WAILING)	Matsuo Asami, Tatsuya Igarashi	Tsuyoshi Tamai	Shigenori Kageyama, Kazuo Miyake	July 27, 2016
After being told off by Seigen, Benio and Rokuro stayed in a bad mood until Mayura comes over to cheer the two of them up. She cooks dinner for the Twin Star Exorcists and walks home with Rokuro in tow. Along the way, Mayura unknowingly gets corrupted and turns into a Kegare. Rokuro refuses to purify her as Benio and Seigen joins him. Seigen battles Kegare Mayura but finds it nearly impossible to purify her. Rokuro, still defiant, asks Seigen if there is another way of saving Mayura. Seigen explains about a technique known as Furu no Koto that he believes only the Twin Star Exorcists can do. The duo casts the technique and Mayura is purified. Yūto then appears and congratulate Rokuro.
17	"The Red Emblem Master Gave Me – New Talisman From Master"; Transliteration: "Shi ga kureta akai akashi NEW TALISMAN FROM MASTER" (Japanese: 師がくれた赤い証 NEW TALISMAN FROM MASTER)	Mitsutaka Noshitani	Yasunori Yamada	Yukihiro Matsushita	August 3, 2016
Seigen attacks Yūto, which proves to be futile. Yūto fatally wounds Seigen who casts a barrier around the Twin Star Exorcists and the fainted Mayura. Seigen resolves to blow himself up; however, Rokuro and Benio escape from inside the barrier, which again Yūto congratulates. Seigen is saved minus one arm and Rokuro manages to land a punch on Yūto who is shocked. He then announces that he will wait for Rokuro's answer (whether he will join Yūto on the dark side) at a place where there are precious memories for the both of them: Hiinatsuki Dormitory. Seigen and Mayura receives rehabilitation, where the former is undergoing surgery and the latter is still unconscious. Jissama has received information that the Twelve Guardians has been mobilized to destroy Yūto and he gives Rokuro a package that Seigen had been wanting to give him. Inside, there is the black exorcist uniform that Seigen wore. Rokuro wears the uniform and announces to Benio that he will defeat Yūto since the Twelve Guardians won't assemble in time.
18	"On the Eve of Battle – Triumph Over Fear"; Transliteration: "Kessen zen'ya TRIUMPH OVER FEAR" (Japanese: 決戦前夜 TRIUMPH OVER FEAR)	Hiroshi Tamada	Yoshimi Narita	Shigenori Kageyama, Ryūichi Kimura	August 10, 2016
To prepare themselves for their battle against Yūto, Rokuro and Benio test the limits of their resonance abilities. After confirming that it amplifies the power of their attacks, at the cost of depleting their energy faster, Benio decides to rest, while Rokuro stays to test the power of the red charm left from Seigen. Tormented with visions of Yūto, Benio flees to Seika Dormitory, where Kinu encourages her to fight her fears and return in order to avoid the regret of letting Rokuro fight alone, but not after giving her a present. Once back, she finds an exhausted Rokuro and realized that the red charm must have increased the power of his corrupted arm. In the next day, Benio wears the black uniform she received from her guardian, and she and Rokuro depart to confront Yūto.
19	"Both Sin and Impurity – The 10 Seconds Decision"; Transliteration: "Tsumi mo kegare mo THE 10 SECONDS DECISION" (Japanese: 罪もけがれも THE 10 SECONDS DECISION)	Yasuo Ejima	Keiichirō Ōchi	Jun Kamiya, Toshihiko Masuda	August 17, 2016
Despite using all their powers and abilities, Rokuro and Benio fail to defeat Yūto, who proves himself to be too strong for them. After damaging Benio's legs, Yūto leaves her to die of blood loss and proceeds to kill Rokuro when she is approached by Kamui, offering his help to defeat Yūto by corrupting her body. She is reluctant at first, but her determination to fight by Rokuro's side once more makes her accept, and she rejoins the fight with her legs bearing a Kegare corruption just like Rokuro's arm.
20	"Our Path – To the Future with Us Two"; Transliteration: "Futari no michi TO THE FUTURE WITH US TWO" (Japanese: ふたりの道 TO THE FUTURE WITH US TWO)	Yoshifumi Sasahara	Naruhisa Arakawa	Yukihiro Matsushita, Tatsuya Igarashi, Shigenori Kageyama	August 24, 2016
Benio uses her new impurity legs to fight on par with Yūto, but her new powers soon run out since she is not yet strong enough to handle them. Regardless, Rokuro takes over again and, despite still receiving a beating, begins to overpower Yūto, with the spirits of the Hiinatsuki Tragedy victims holding him up. Once Yūto is sent into a dark abyss, defeated for the time being, the Twin Stars pass out and soon wake up in a hospital in Kyoto. After recovering, the Twin Stars are brought before the Twelve (currently eleven) Guardians, who berate them for recklessly going after Yūto before they made their move. Benio explains that Yūto would've made his own move, causing more casualties, before the Guardians could, but Arima still insists that they give up fighting to give birth to the Miko. At first Rokuro sarcastically agrees, but then turns around and says that they shouldn't leave the fate of the world in the hands of a child, and he and Benio proclaim they will end the Exorcist-Kegare War before it is even born. The Guardians then allow them two years to get sufficiently strong enough to stop a prophesied catastrophe, but Arima says that if they fail to become more powerful than the Twelve Guardians, they must adhere to their demand to bring the Miko into the world, to which the Twin Stars agree. Meanwhile, Mayura asks Seigen, who has been demoted, to train her to be an exorcist, saying she doesn't want to burden Rokuro and Benio anymore. Later, Rokuro and Benio go on a date at a festival in Kyoto, where they mutually agree that they prefer their current relationship, and are in no rush to marry and have a kid. Rokuro also gives Benio some new hair accessories, which she happily accepts.
21	"Rebirth of the Twin Stars – Sweetie Fairy"; Transliteration: "Sōsei Shinsei SWEETIE FAIRY" (Japanese: 双星新生 SWEETIE FAIRY)	Hiroaki Nishimura	Naruhisa Arakawa	Shinichi Masaki, Tomohisa Taguchi, Yoshifumi Sasahara	August 31, 2016
Two years have passed since their fight with Yūto, Rokuro and Benio are fighting in Magano alongside Haruka, the residents of Seika Dormitory, and Mayura, who is on her first mission with them. After defeating all enemies, they quickly return for Rokuro, Benio and Mayura's first day at High School. As news of multiple cases of poisoning attracts the attention of Seigen, Rokuro, Benio and the others return to Magano, where they discover a young child lost inside and they take her back with them. With no clue about her family, Rokuro calls her "Sae", and both he and Benio decide to take care of her for now. In the next day, on the way to school, Rokuro, Benio and Mayura come across several people collapsing on the street.
22	"It's Impure, Y'know? – Philosophical Filthy Seraphim"; Transliteration: "Kega rete n ja 〜 n PHILOSOPHICAL FILTHY SERAPHIM" (Japanese: ケガれてんじゃ～ん PHILOSOPHICAL FILTHY SERAPHIM)	Akira Shimizu	Katsura Murayama	Yukihiro Matsushita, Toshihiko Masuda	September 7, 2016
Rokuro, Benio and Mayura speculate that the collapsing people are being victims of Kegare corruption due to some miasma emanating from an unknown location. As several large Kegare start pouring into the city, Rokuro and Benio urge Mayura to call for Seigen's help. When she reaches him at Seika Dormitory, he concludes that it is because a massive breach on Magano, called a "Dragon Spot" was opened. He then leaves with the other exorcists to assist the Twin Stars, taking Sae in tow. Meanwhile a man sacrifices his lover to escape from the Kegare, just to be later killed by a bespectacled female Basara for his cowardice. The exorcists gather at the Dragon Spot's site, where they also meet the Basara, who introduces herself as Suzu. She develops an interest on Rokuro, Benio and Sae, but leaves instead of confronting them. After Seigen and the others fail to close the Dragon Spot using normal means, Rokuro and Benio use their Resonance to increase their power and seal it for good.
23	"Westward, Twin Stars – Hard To Be Mother"; Transliteration: "Sōsei nishi e HARD TO BE MOTHER" (Japanese: 双星 西へ HARD TO BE MOTHER)	Matsuo Asami	Keiichirō Ōchi	Shigenori Kageyama, Chiaki Kon	September 14, 2016
State media continues to report about "mass infections" ravaging the country. Rokuro and Benio are the only exorcists capable of closing the Dragon Spots responsible for the pandemic. Kinako possesses an RV and the Twin Star Exorcists and Sae set off for Minamisuwa to plug the hole. At first, Benio was critical due to her connection with Yuto the traitor, but proven herself afterwards. The exorcists go off to fight the Kegare unleashed by the Dragon Spot and Sae is left behind in the RV under Kinako's protection. The exorcists face off against a Basara named Moro, who manages to snatch and tear up the talisman that was to be used for sealing the hole; however, Sae, who has noticed a talisman Benio left behind in the RV, has Kinako drive her to the battle scene to give it to Benio. Benio is initially angry at Sae for approaching the danger, but the talisman allows her and Rokuro to destroy the Dragon Spot.
24	"The Kegare's Dream – What Is Beautiful?"; Transliteration: "Kegare no mita yume WHAT IS BEAUTIFUL?" (Japanese: ケガレの見た夢 WHAT IS BEAUTIFUL?)	Takuma Suzuki	Yasunori Yamada	Yukihiro Matsushita, Toshihiko Masuda	September 21, 2016
Sae is captured by a powerful Kegare at a derelict amusement park surrounded by miasma, much to Benio and Rokuro's distress, but to everyone's surprise, the creature does not intend to hurt anyone, and the Twin Stars falter with their duty to cleanse it.
25	"Celestial Avatar – Come Back! Southpaw"; Transliteration: "Ten gen kū ga COME BACK! SOUTHPAW" (Japanese: 天・元・空・我 COME BACK! SOUTHPAW)	Mitsutaka Noshitani	Tsuyoshi Tamai	Jun Kamiya, Chiaki Kon	September 28, 2016
A baseball pro is counting down the days to his retirement, until a Dragon Spot opens at his hometown, and he joins forces with the Twin Stars to help close it.
26	"Twin Stars VS Twins – Basara Twins' Strings"; Transliteration: "Sōsei vs Sōsei BASARA TWINS' STRINGS" (Japanese: 双星VS双生 BASARA TWINS' STRINGS)	Rokou Ogiwara	Yoshimi Narita	Shigenori Kageyama, Kazuo Miyake	October 5, 2016
Rokuro and Benio are confronted by a pair of Basara twins Momochi and Chijiwa who are sent to eliminate them under the orders of Kuranashi, another Basara, who seems to be the source behind the appearance of the Dragon Spots. When the Basara fire a strike on the exorcists, Sae unleashes a strange power that protects them. After their battle is left unfinished, Momochi is found heavily wounded. Kuranashi sees him as useless and gives Chijiwa his remaining spell power, under the belief that the Twin Stars are to blame.
27	"Mayura-chan's Secret – Mayura's Secret Lesson"; Transliteration: "Himitsu no mayura-chan MAYURA'S SECRET LESSON" (Japanese: ひみつの繭良ちゃん MAYURA'S SECRET LESSON)	Akira Shimizu	Keiichirō Ōchi	Yukihiro Matsushita, Toshihiko Masuda	October 12, 2016
While Rokuro and Benio are away, Mayura seeks to improve herself, and asks assistance from Shimon.
28	"Unomiya Tenma – Transcendence"; Transliteration: "Unomiya Tenma TRANSCENDENCE" (Japanese: 鸕宮天馬 TRANSCENDENCE)	Matsuo Asami	Katsura Murayama	Kazuo Miyake, Tomohisa Taguchi, Tatsuya Igarashi	October 19, 2016
The Twin Stars face another powerful Basara, but this time, Tenma Unomiya, the strongest of the Twelve Guardians, appear to assist them.
29	"A Promise with Sae – Missing Exorcist Master"; Transliteration: "Sae to no yakusoku MISSING EXORCIST MASTER" (Japanese: さえとの約束 MISSING EXORCIST MASTER)	Hiroaki Nishimura	Yoshimi Narita	Yoshinori Odaka, Yukihiro Matsushita	October 26, 2016
At last, Rokuro and Benio arrive at Kyoto to tour when they follow Sae to an underground passage at the Exorcist Union headquarters where they find a mysterious gigantic tree and meet Subaru and Tatara there. However, the two are devastated when Subaru reveals Sae's real identity, that she is part of the Ame-no-mihashira tree that separates Magano and the real world created by Abe no Seimei. A Basara had infiltrated and damaged a branch which weakened the barrier causing the Dragon Spots, and the broken branch took the form of an entity that is Sae. To stop the Dragon Spots from appearing, they must part ways from her.
30	"Forever Smiling – Lovely Smile Forever"; Transliteration: "Itsu made mo egao de LOVELY SMILE FOREVER" (Japanese: いつまでも笑顔で LOVELY SMILE FOREVER)	Shintaro Itoga	Naruhisa Arakawa	Toshihiko Masuda, Yukihiro Matsushita, Tomohisa Taguchi	November 2, 2016
After Arima disappears during a fight with Kuranashi, the Twelve Guardians attempt to perform a ritual to seal the Dragon Spots from good, but fail, and Sae is forced to bid farewell to Rokuro and Benio in order to save everybody and returns to the Ame-no-mihashira tree.
31	"Because I'm With You – Wai Wa Kinako Ya!"; Transliteration: "Soba ni irukara WAI WA KINAKO YA!" (Japanese: そばにいるから WAI WA KINAKO YA!)	Jun Takahashi	Yasunori Yamada	Jun Kamiya, Shigenori Kageyama	November 9, 2016
Kinako reminisces the time when he became Benio's familiar, and how they became inseparable.
32	"Into Chaos – Seeking The Past, Seeking The Future"; Transliteration: "Konton no naka ni SEEKING THE PAST, SEEKING THE FUTURE" (Japanese: 混沌の中に SEEKING THE PAST, SEEKING THE FUTURE)	Ayataka Tanemura	Katsura Murayama	Kazuo Miyake, Shinichi Masaki	November 16, 2016
With Sae's last words to him in mind, Rokuro has a shocking revelation when he questions Seigen about his true origins. Sometime later, he and Benio have another encounter with Suzu, which they settle in an unexpected way.
33	"The Master Repays a Favor – I Want You To Eat Me"; Transliteration: "Moro no ongaeshi I WANT YOU TO EAT ME" (Japanese: 師(もろ)の恩返し I WANT YOU TO EAT ME)	Akira Shimizu	Keiichirō Ōchi	Yukihiro Matsushita	November 23, 2016
The Twelve Guardians are assembled and informs that Arima was killed by Kuranashi. Mikage Tsuchimikado takes the head exorcist position. In response, the Guardians turn all their attentions in hunting him down to avenge their leader and Shimon transfers to Rokuro's school to protect the Twin Stars, unaware that their enemy has an even greater scheme in mind. Meanwhile, Miku Zeze and Sakura Sada faces Moro.
34	"The Greatest Duo?! – Wachi vs Washi & Watashi"; Transliteration: "Mei konbi jane~e! WACHI vs WASHI&WATASHI" (Japanese: 名コンビじゃねぇ！ WACHI vs WASHI&WATASHI)	Yūji Kanbara, Tatsuya Igarashi, Rokou Ogiwara, Naoki Horiuchi	Tsuyoshi Tamai	Shigenori Kageyama, Jun Kamiya	November 30, 2016
Sakura and Miku, the Twelve Guardian pair, challenge and exact revenge at Moro the Basara who slaughtered Sakura's father and Miku's love interest twenty-years prior and succeed. Meanwhile, Rokuro and Benio are studying the foundation of exorcist and Kegare origins. That night, almost all the exorcists across the country who took part in the restoration of mass infection appear to be possessed and enter Magano without notice. The next day, Shimon makes a surprise transfer to the same high school and class of Mayura, Rokuro and Benio.
35	"The Puppeteer's Revenge – I Am Not Alone"; Transliteration: "Fukushū no Urabe-shi I AM NOT ALONE" (Japanese: 復讐の傀儡師 I AM NOT ALONE)	Kiyoshi Murayama	Yoshimi Narita	Yukihiro Matsushita, Kazuo Miyake	December 7, 2016
Shimon ask Seigen advice on getting used to normal school life. Rokuro is having a hard time with Benio's intense cooking. Then Chijiwa makes his appearance at the high school and has the entire student body under his control to persuade the Twin Stars. A battle ensues until Chijiwa traps Shimon within his strings.
36	"What Must Be Protected – What Is Really Important"; Transliteration: "Mamorubekimono WHAT IS REALLY IMPORTANT" (Japanese: 守るべきもの WHAT IS REALLY IMPORTANT)	Hiroaki Nishimura	Yoshimi Narita	Toshihiko Masuda, Shigenori Kageyama	December 14, 2016
The news of the disappearance of numerous exorcists across the country has the Twelve Guardians in an intense predicament. The young exorcists convince Shimon to not recklessly handle the Basara alone. Mayura and Benio cleanse as many individuals as they can, while Rokuro and Shimon teamed to settle Chijiwa. Rokuro distracts Chijiwa for Shimon to activate his ace technique Vermillion Wing: Divine Enchantment on the Basara. Chijiwa plays one last trick and holds the school hostages to death, until Rokuro enthralls his new technique that simultaneously release the captives. Shimon shows a newfound respect for Rokuro.
37	"Spirits Soaring in the City of Romance – Tell Me Honest Feelings"; Transliteration: "Koi no machi maiagaru TELL ME HONEST FEELINGS" (Japanese: 恋の町 舞い上がる TELL ME HONEST FEELINGS)	Keiichi Matsuki	Yasunori Yamada	Yukihiro Matsushita	December 21, 2016
Rokuro finds a love letter from a girl who previously rejected him, but is now fond of him. He tells her that he no longer has an interest in her, though she asks if there's another girl he likes. Benio and Mayura interrupt before he could answer. Later, Shinnosuke and Atsushi have them witness Ryogo and Haruka's growing relationship. Mikage assembles the Twelve Guardians (excluding Seigen) to counteract Kuranashi's upcoming plan, however, he summons giant Kegares in the real world to keep them busy while he summons a giant barrier that envelops the city of Narukami, trapping the Twin Stars, and all its other inhabitants inside.
38	"Narugami's Most Ill Fated Day – No Way To Run, No Place To Hide"; Transliteration: "Narugami-chō saikyō no hi NO WAY TO RUN, NO PLACE TO HIDE" (Japanese: 鳴神町最凶の日 NO WAY TO RUN, NO PLACE TO HIDE)	Akira Shimizu	Katsura Murayama	Jun Kamiya, Kazuo Miyake	January 4, 2017
By the power of Kuranashi's spell, the entire city of Narukami is lifted to the sky, and a massive Kegare plant is summoned in its middle, that begins to attack the townspeople. Kuranashi then appears before Rokuro and Benio, and informs them that the plant will have all the citizens killed in around two hours, but it will keep regenerating unless its bulb located in the underground is destroyed. After Kuranashi leaves, the exorcists regroup and establish a course of action (especially Benio upon realizing Kuranashi is the reason Sae had to leave). Seigen and Mayura leave to destroy the bulb, while the Twin Stars attack the plant above, and the others help evacuate the citizens with Kinako's help. However, even with his Divine Armament equipped, Seigen is overpowered by the bulb's tentacles and both he and Mayura are on a dire situation.
39	"The Sacred Beast of Love – Daughter's Fight! Father's Delight!"; Transliteration: "Jiai no reijū DAUGHTER'S FIGHT! FATHER'S DELIGHT" (Japanese: 慈愛の霊獣 DAUGHTER'S FIGHT! FATHER'S DELIGHT)	Yoshitaka Fujimoto	Keiichirō Ōchi	Toshihiko Masuda, Shigenori Kageyama	January 11, 2017
Kuranashi appears before Seigen and Mayura using Mayura's mother as a distraction to prevent them from destroying the bulb. Even after using his crystal talisman at the cost of all his strength, Seigen fails to deal a fatal blow to the enemy and urges Mayura to flee. Mayura, however, refuses to run away and uses the power of Seigen's Twelve Guardian, Byakko, to destroy the bulb and Kuranashi flees, leaving the plant vulnerable as it loses its regenerating powers.
40	"Twin Stars' Hearts Dance – Finally They Kissed?"; Transliteration: "Sōsei tokimeku FINALLY THEY KISSED?" (Japanese: 双星ときめく FINALLY THEY KISSED?)	Mitsutaka Noshitani	Naruhisa Arakawa	Tomohisa Taguchi, Jun Kamiya	January 18, 2017
With the bulb destroyed, the Twelve Guardians are busy dealing with the Kegare around the city, leaving the task of taking down the plant to the Twin Stars. Meanwhile, Rokuro and Benio discover the plant's core and after being almost killed by it they figure out that even after the bulb was destroyed, the plant is still gathering energy out of the air. Then they climb to the top and destroy it while it recharges, finally killing the plant. However, the city of Narukami starts falling towards the ground and the Twelve Guardians use all their power in the Rikujin Shinka ritual to have it touch the ground safely. Once the city is finally saved, Kuranashi then reveals his true objective by taking advantage of the weakened state of the Twelve Guardians to capture them, seeking to absorb their energy.
41	"The Twelve Guardians Fall! – Have A Nice Nightmare, 12 Guardians"; Transliteration: "Jūni Tenshō, Otsu! HAVE A NICE NIGHTMARE, 12 GUARDIANS" (Japanese: 十二天将、堕つ！ HAVE A NICE NIGHTMARE, 12 GUARDIANS)	Ayataka Tanemura	Tsuyoshi Tamai	Yukihiro Matsushita	January 25, 2017
Having subdued all the Twelve Guardians, Kuranashi attracts Rokuro and Benio to a church in Magano, where he reveals that all of his schemes were part of his plan to capture all exorcists and use their energy to conquer both Magano and the real world. In the occasion, he reveals that he not only captured the Twelve Guardians and the other exorcists from around Japan, but Yūto as well. After draining the energy of the Twelve Guardians, Kuranashi fights the Twin Stars, who are powerless before an enemy who uses the Guardians' own techniques against them, until Tatara, being a fierce Shikigami instead of a human, manages to break free and sacrifices himself to gravely injure Kuranashi. To recover himself, Kuranashi absorbs Yūto's body, but backfires as he has been used all along when the boy takes advantage of the situation to destroy Kuranashi from within and absorb his stolen powers.
42	"I Come from Magano – Say It Ain't So, Rokuro!"; Transliteration: "Furusato wa wazawai no SAY IT AIN'T SO, ROKURO!" (Japanese: 故郷は禍野 SAY IT AIN'T SO, ROKURO!)	Yoji Sato	Yoshimi Narita	Shigenori Kageyama	February 1, 2017
Yūto reveals he deliberately allowed himself captured by Kuranashi who was intending to use him as part of his plan to fuse Magano and the human realm into a single reality, but in the end, he was just waiting for an opportunity to absorb the Basara and obtain all the power he accumulated. After easily deflecting the Twin Stars' attacks, Yūto flees and is followed by them. The three arrive at a mysterious location, that Yūto claims to be that bottom of the Ame-no-Mihashira tree where the original exorcist, Abe no Seimei lies dormant. Yūto also claims that by absorbing all of Seimei's powers, killing him, he also learned all of his knowledge and discovered the secret behind Rokuro's origins, trying to provoke him, but Benio helps him to calm down. Yūto then traps Benio into a barrier and attacks her until she is seemingly killed. Guilt-ridden and devastated over her apparent death, an enraged Rokuro suffers a strange transformation, when Yūto reveals that Rokuro is actually a Kegare. Just as Rokuro's transformation is about to reach its peak, and the two boys are about to fight, Arima, who was supposed to be dead, appears and rescue the Twin Stars before retreating with them.
43	"The Millennial Dream – Melancholic Misanthrope"; Transliteration: "Chitose no yume MELANCHOLIC MISANTHROPE" (Japanese: 千年の夢 MELANCHOLIC MISANTHROPE)	Akira Shimizu	Katsura Murayama	Toshihiko Masuda	February 8, 2017
While Benio recuperates from her injuries, Arima reveals to Seigen that during his fight with Kuranashi, he triggered a special spell that separated his body and soul temporarily, allowing him to witness events from the past. In the occasion, he discovered that Abe no Seimei created Magano as a place to banish humanity's residual Yin energy to, but its accumulation gave birth to stronger impurities, like the Basara, later establishing the Twelve Guardians and founding the Exorcist Union to deal with them. However, Arima confides to Rokuro that knowing it was just a temporary solution, Seimei set in motion the events that led to the advent of the Twin Stars, while creating the strongest impurity, the "Cataclysm King", to wipe out humanity should they become a threat to the world, who is none other than Rokuro himself. Arima also explains in order to get rid of the Yin energy stored in his body and become fully human, Rokuro must conceive with Benio a child, the Miko, that will inherit Benio's massive Yang energy to balance itself. In doubt about what he should do, Rokuro returns home and meets Suzu, who instead of fighting him, suggests him to follow his own heart before leaving. Later at night, when Rokuro is out shopping, he is once again approached by Yūto, who threatens to destroy the entire world with his powers should Rokuro take too long to come after him and makes his leave.
44	"Distanced Despite Their Love – Farewell, My Precious"; Transliteration: "Aisure tōku FAREWELL, MY PRECIOUS" (Japanese: 愛すれど遠く FAREWELL, MY PRECIOUS)	Keiichi Matsuki	Yasunori Yamada	Jun Kamiya, Kazuo Miyake	February 15, 2017
Benio nearly recovers from her injuries while having doubts about Rokuro being an impurity. As the city of Narukami makes progress in major repairing its infrastructure with the help of the exorcists, Benio comes to see Rokuro only to excuse himself from her. He holds a ring box in his hand then Arima appoints him to a serious discussion. Considering Yuto's limitless strength is no trick and fearing that Rokuro would go on a rampage following his frenzy transformation, Rokuro proposes to have them both killed at the worst case possible. Mayura and Kinako ride Benio around town, they find that Benio's favorite sweet shop is closing down due to the disaster though a clerk gives Benio a last box of ohagi. Benio reminisce the times she spend with Rokuro when visiting the spot of their first meeting. Back at the villa, Benio finally admits her love for Rokuro just as he arrives. Mayura leaves the duo alone; however, Rokuro breaks up his partnership with Benio, not wanting to risk her life any longer then leaves her in a state of depression. Yūto awaits Rokuro's arrival for their promising final death battle.
45	"The Couple Alone – Lonely Twin Exorcists"; Transliteration: "Hitori kiri no futari LONELY TWIN EXORCIST" (Japanese: ひとりきりの二人 LONELY TWIN EXORCIST)	Yoshitaka Fujimoto	Yoshimi Narita	Yukihiro Matsushita	February 22, 2017
As Rokuro and Yūto begin fighting, Seigen meets Arima and reveals his intention to assist Rokuro, but Arima dissuades him, affirming that with the Twelve Guardians and most of the other exorcists out of commission, Rokuro is the only one that can stand against Yūto. Meanwhile, Benio is in turmoil following Rokuro's sudden decision to break up their partnership, and her friends attempt to cheer her up. Yūto easily overpowers Rokuro, who then questions him about his true motivations. Yūto then responds that at that point, the only thing that matters to him is fighting with Rokuro, who then decides to unlock his impurity powers, hoping that if he goes out of control and transforms into the Cataclysm King, the curse Arima placed in his heart at his request will kill him.
46	"Yuuto – Destiny"; Transliteration: "Yūto DESTINY" (Japanese: 悠斗 DESTINY)	Shintaro Itoga	Keiichirō Ōchi	Shigenori Kageyama	March 1, 2017
With his Yin powers unlocked, Rokuro gains the upper hand against Yūto, who in response, releases all the energy of the Twelve Guardians and Basara stored inside his body. Meanwhile, Arima confronts his aide, Mikage, who reveals himself as Abe no Seimei's shikigami. Due to the Ame-no-mihashira's Yang energy being delivered to Benio's unborn self, Mikage explains that with Benio having a twin brother inheriting Yin energy that rivals Rokuro's, Seimei's plans went out of focus. As feeling himself an unnecessary existence, Yūto ends up compelled to become Rokuro's nemesis. However, even with powers far exceeding his maximum capacity, Yūto fails to defeat Rokuro, who declares himself the victor. Yūto then threatens to launch an attack in the human world by opening a Dragon Spot, and Rokuro loses his sanity, dealing Yūto a fatal blow, but forgets all about his friends and Benio in the process and transforms into the Cataclysm King. The situation worsens even more when the curse placed in Rokuro's heart fails to kill him and he proceeds to destroy the human world.
47	"Benio – Positive"; Transliteration: "Benio POSITIVE" (Japanese: 紅緒 POSITIVE)	Rokou Ogiwara	Naruhisa Arakawa	Natsuo Tsukada	March 8, 2017
Benio wakes up and sees the live TV news of a giant Kegare standing in Kyoto, who she recognises to be Rokuro. She has the RV and monorail Kinako transport her straight to Rokuro's location, and along the way the Cataclysm King is emitting the Grand Cleansing ritual affecting the entire world, whose civilians with weak spell power are fossilized and the Yin energy is stored within the king that will soon resurrect Abe no Seimei. Arima tries to defend against the Cataclysm King, but Mikage confiscates his talismans saying that it's pointless to resist. Mikage shows Benio a closed space where conflict and selfishness doesn't exist. Dissatisfied with the ideal world, Benio demands to have Rokuro human again. Mikage agrees but only on the condition that Benio joins her body with Seimei's body together and share her Yang energy to the Ame-no-mihashira tree. However, she is troubled by the fact that she won't meet Rokuro ever again.
48	"Unity – Solidarity"; Transliteration: "Danketsu SOLIDARITY" (Japanese: 団結 SOLIDARITY)	Eiichi Tokura, Naoki Takahashi	Naruhisa Arakawa	Jun Kamiya	March 15, 2017
Benio had made the tough decision and follows Mikage to the bottom of the Ame-no-Mihashira tree then commences the ritual as the Taijitu circle appears absorbing the Cataclysm King with the tree rising above. Arima rushes to the scene and retrieves Rokuro, who has now returned to normal. Regaining his consciousness, Arima and Kinako explain everything to Rokuro, giving him Benio's hairpin. Suzu suddenly shows up and starts dancing and singing around to hearten Rokuro before departing again. A talisman of Abe no Seimei informs them of his total revolution, to which Rokuro and Arima condemn him of. As the exorcist cast arrives, they charge towards the firing Ame-no-Mihashira with the slightest hope of rescuing Benio, that has Rokuro going alone.
49	"Revival – Restoration"; Transliteration: "Fukkatsu RESTORATION" (Japanese: 復活 RESTORATION)	Akira Shimizu, Tatsuya Igarashi	Naruhisa Arakawa	Tatsuya Igarashi	March 22, 2017
Rokuro reaches the top of the tree to find Benio inside a crystal cocoon. Thanks to an exorcist ritual that Arima offered to Rokuro earlier, he was able to link Benio's hairpin with the other to break her free from the cocoon. Meanwhile, Arima interferes with Mikage, as the two start fighting each other with a powerful spell called Megha shaniye svaha. When Arima becomes too exhausted to fight, Kamui makes a surprise entrance. After quarrelling over their differences, the Twin Stars suddenly start smooching back. Arima and Kamui are thrown out, and then the Twin Stars resort to uphold the world from being cleansed by the Ame-no-Mihashira's crystal nectar. Using Benio's hairpins for a risky Resonance performance and eliciting everything they have been through together, they target the energy source in an effort to bring it down.
50	"Twin Stars – Twins"; Transliteration: "Sōsei TWINS" (Japanese: 双星 TWINS)	Akira Shimizu, Tomohisa Taguchi	Naruhisa Arakawa	Tomohisa Taguchi	March 29, 2017
Abe no Seimei berates the Twin Stars that in spite of their enduring actions, their contradiction created Kegares, after which he renders them powerless. At that time, a vision of Sae enters Rokuro and Benio's subconscious reminding them to wake up; following the rest of the Twelve Guardians and the entire bonds they formed providing Rokuro and Benio with the much needed strength to overpower the Ame-no-Mihashira. After it is destroyed, the spell power that it drained gets freed across the globe. Rokuro accepts his engagement with Benio, though Mikage embarrasses them further. He later disappears for another thousand years, awaiting a better world ahead. Later, a wedding reception is held for Ryogo and Haruka, and the Twin Stars delivers an emotional speech. At sunset, Rokuro presents Benio with a ring box containing new hair accessories, after which the two later kiss. In the credits, Subaru is seen with an infant Tatara, while the other Twelve Guardians visit their families or do their other activities.
