= Koyama Fujio =

Koyama Fujio (小山富士夫; March 24, 1900—October 7, 1975) was a scholar of Japanese pottery and porcelain and Chinese ceramics. He was also a potter in his own right.

Amongst his publications are:

- "Two Thousand Years of Oriental Ceramics" (1961).
- "The Heritage of Japanese Ceramics" (1973), translated into English from the original publication in "Nihon Toji no Dento" in 1967

He developed the category of the Six Ancient Kilns of Japan.

The Idemitsu Museum of Arts in Tokyo dedicated a retrospective "Tsuchi ni Asobu, To ni Manabu" (Play With Clay, Learn From Pots) in the spring of 2000.

== Associated people ==
- Sam Francis (Painter and potter)
- Hajime Katō (potter)
- Toyozō Arakawa
- Kaneshige Toyo
- Rosanjin
