= Six Ancient Kilns =

Group of Japanese ceramic kilns

The Six Ancient Kilns (六古窯 Rokkoyō) is a category developed by Koyama Fujio (小山富士夫 1900–1975) in the post-war period to describe the most important ceramic kilns of traditional Japanese pottery, in emulation of the Five Great Kilns of Song China. In the Japanese cases a traditional regional style of pottery, produced at numerous actual kiln sites, is meant. Unlike the Chinese "kilns", the Japanese styles continue to be produced to the present day.

The six kilns are:

- Bizen ware (備前焼, Bizen-yaki), produced in Bizen, Okayama
- Echizen ware (越前焼, Echizen-yaki), produced in Echizen, Odacho and Miyazaki, Fukui Prefecture
- Seto ware (瀬戸焼, Seto-yaki), produced in Seto, Aichi Prefecture
- Shigaraki ware (信楽焼, Shigaraki-yaki), produced in Kōka, Shiga, east of Lake Biwa
- Tamba ware, also known as Tachikui ware (丹波立杭焼, Tamba-Tachikui-yaki), produced in Sasayama and Tachikui in Hyōgo
- Tokoname ware (常滑焼, Tokoname-yaki), produced in Tokoname, Aichi Prefecture

The Okayama Prefectural Bizen Ceramic Museum held an exhibition in 2001 about the six kilns.

== See also ==
- Enshū's Seven Kilns
- List of Japanese ceramics sites
