= Botamochi =

Japanese confection

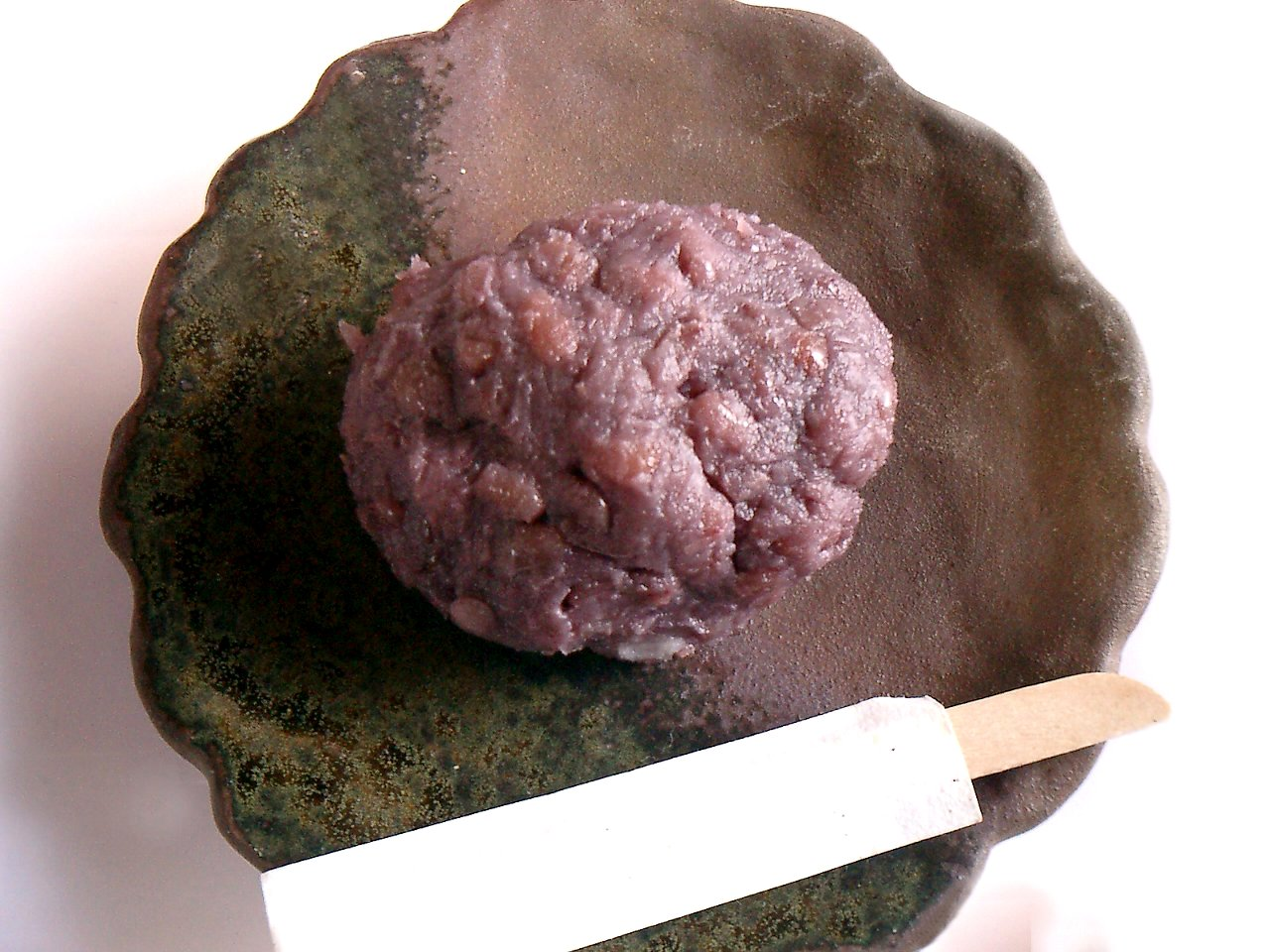
- Type: Confectionery, Rice cake
- Place of origin: Japan
- Main ingredients: glutinous rice, short-grain rice, sweet red bean paste
- Variations: Ohagi

Botamochi (ぼたもち or 牡丹餅) is a wagashi (Japanese confection) made with glutinous rice, white rice (ratio of 7:3, or only glutinous rice), and sweet azuki paste (red bean paste). They are made by soaking the rice for approximately 1 hour. The rice is then cooked, and a thick azuki paste is hand-packed around pre-formed balls of rice. Botamochi is eaten as sacred food as offering during the weeks of the spring and the autumn Higan in Japan.

Another name for this kind of confection is ohagi (おはぎ), the origin and meaning of which is a subject of debate, with some saying that ohagi uses a slightly different texture of azuki paste but is otherwise almost identical. It is made in autumn and some recipe variations in both cases call for a coating of soy flour to be applied to the ohagi after the azuki paste.

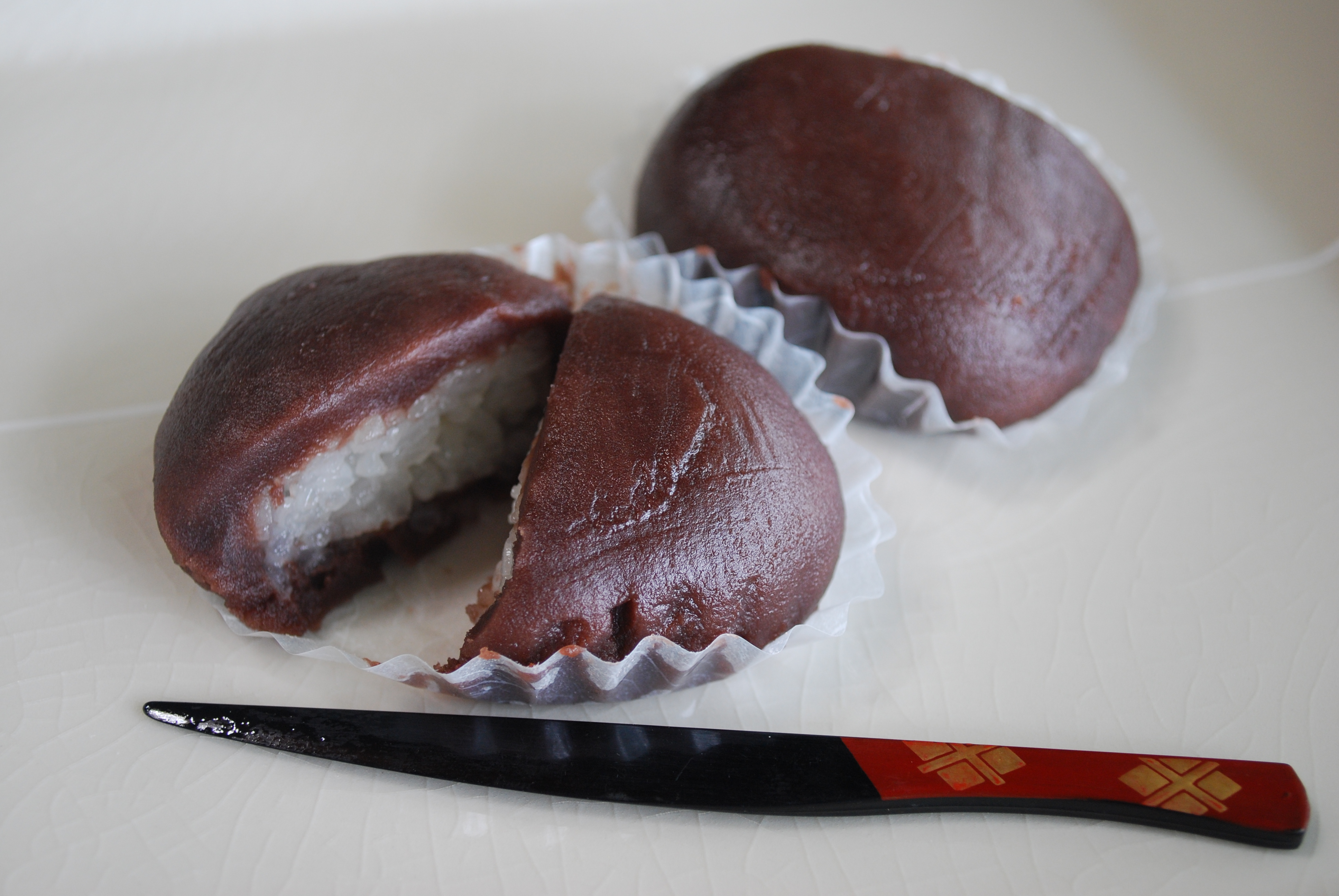
Botamochi (Koshian type, which is smooth and fine-grained red bean paste type）

The two different names are, some people say, derived from the Botan (peony) which blooms in the spring and the Hagi (Japanese bush clover or Lespedeza) which blooms during autumn.

Botamochi is the modern name for the dish kaimochi (かいもち) mentioned in the Heian period text Uji Shūi Monogatari (宇治拾遺物語).

The proverb Tana kara botamochi (棚からぼたもち), literally "a botamochi falls down from a shelf", means "receiving a windfall", "a lucky break".

The term is also used for a specific pattern of Bizen ware with two, three or five round marks, as if the marks of the small balls of rice cakes were left on the plate.

== See also ==
- Higan
- Mochi
