= Imbe, Okayama =

Dissolved municipality in Okayama prefecture, Japan

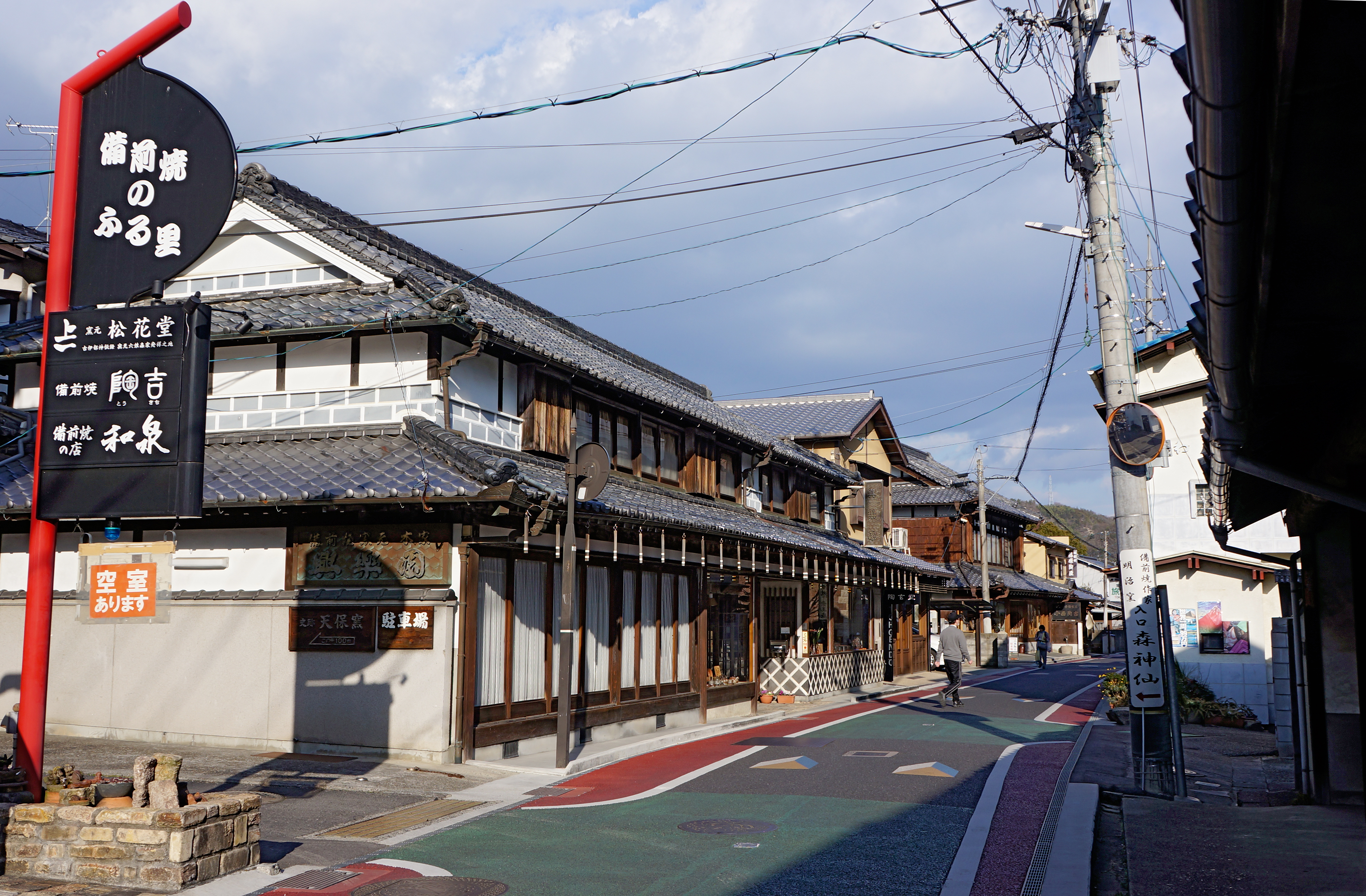
Imbe in Bizen

Imbe (伊部町), or Inbe, is a township in the Bizen, Okayama prefecture in western Japan. It is known for the traditional production of Bizen ware.

The public transportation hub is Imbe Station on the Akō Line.
