= Kaneshige Toyo =

Japanese potter

Kaneshige Toyo (金重 陶陽) (from Okayama, Japan 1896–1967) was a potter in Imbe, Japan. He helped to establish the Japan Kōgei Association in 1955, and was deemed a living national treasure in 1956 for his work in the Bizen style ceramics. He was a member of what is known as the "Momoyama revival movement" of the 1930s and is credited with having rediscovered the techniques used to produce the wabi teawares of the Azuchi-Momoyama period.
