= Tenwa Station =

Railway station in Akō, Hyōgo Prefecture, Japan

Tenwa Station 天和駅
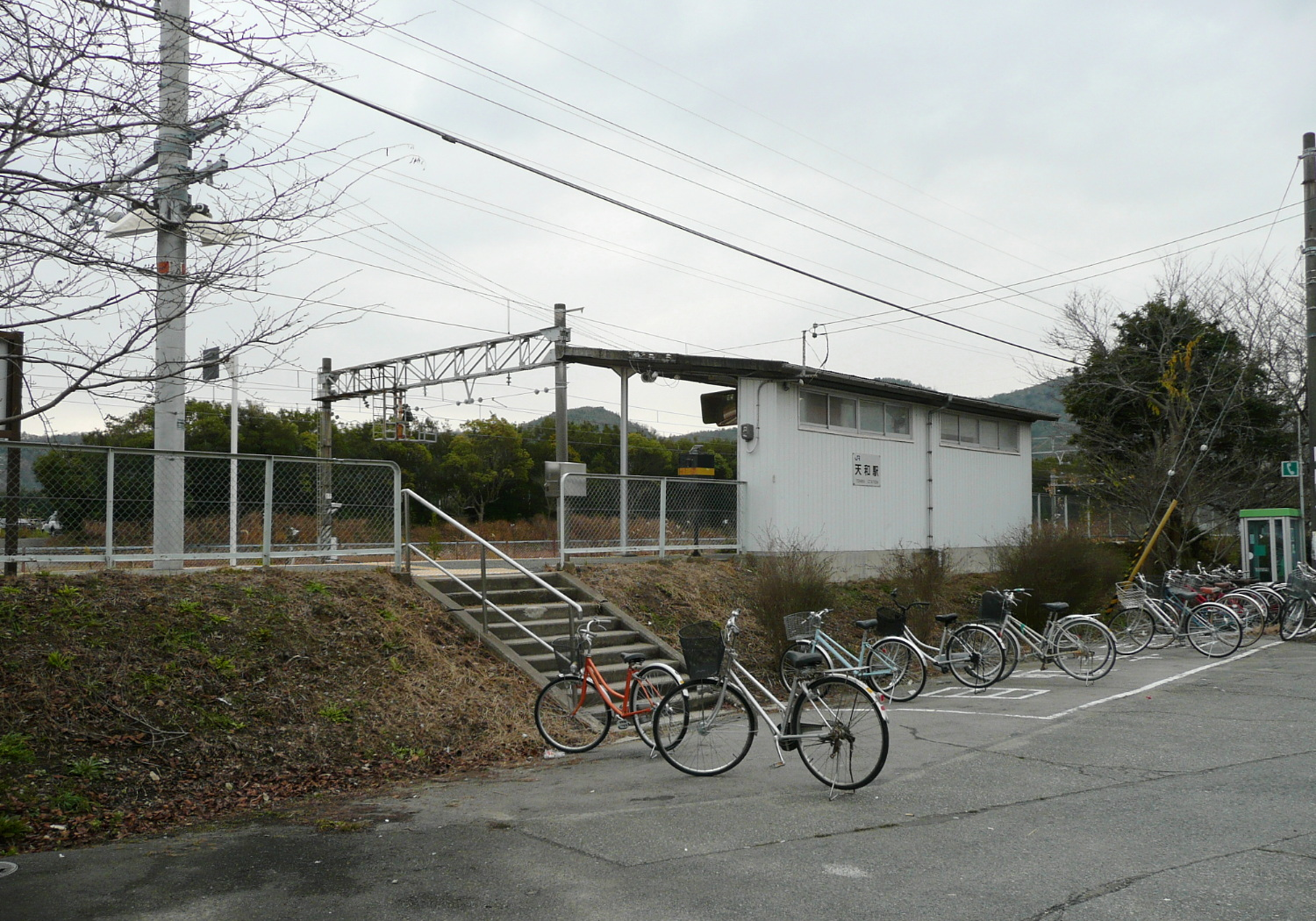
- Tenwa Station in January 2008

General information
- Location: 486 Tenwa, Akō-shi, Hyōgo-ken 678-0256; Japan
- Coordinates: 34.7490°N 134.3513°E
- Owner: West Japan Railway Company
- Operator: West Japan Railway Company
- Line: Akō Line
- Distance: 14.5 km (9.0 miles) from Aioi
- Platforms: 1 side platform
- Connections: Bus stop

Other information
- Status: Unstaffed
- Website: Official website

History
- Opened: 1 May 1963

Passengers
- FY2019: 262 daily
Location
- Location within Hyōgo Prefecture Location within Japan

Tenwa Station (天和駅, Tenwa-eki) is a passenger railway station located in the city of Akō, Hyōgo Prefecture, Japan, operated by the West Japan Railway Company (JR West).

== Lines ==
Tenwa Station is served by the Akō Line, and is located 14.5 kilometers from the terminus of the line at Aioi, and 4.0 kilometers from Banshū-Akō.

== Station layout ==
The station consists of one ground-level side platform serving a single-directional track, with the platform on the right side when facing in the direction of Okayama. There is no station building, and the station is unattended.

== Adjacent stations ==
«	Service	»
JR West
Akō Line
Banshū-Akō	-	Bizen-Fukukawa

== History ==
Tenwa Station was opened on May 1, 1963. With the privatization of the Japan National Railways (JNR) on April 1, 1987, the station came under the aegis of the West Japan Railway Company.

== Passenger statistics ==
In fiscal 2019, the station was used by an average of 262 passengers daily

== Surrounding area ==
- Mitsubishi Electric Ako Factory
- Ako City Akonishi Elementary School
- Japan National Route 250

== See also ==
- List of railway stations in Japan
