= Gauntlett =

Gauntlett is a surname. Notable people with the surname include:

- Akheem Gauntlett (born 1990), Jamaican sprinter
- David Gauntlett (born 1971), British sociologist and media theorist
- George Edward Luckman Gauntlett (1868–1956), English educator
- Henry Gauntlett (1805–1876), English hymn writer
- Hughenna L. Gauntlett (1915–2010), American physician
- Jeremy Gauntlett (born 1950), British-South African lawyer
- John Gauntlett (1643–1719), English politician
- Rob Gauntlett (1987–2009), British explorer
- Roger Gauntlett (1573–1627), English politician
- Tsuneko Gauntlett (1873–1953), Japanese feminist and pacifist
- Victor Gauntlett (1942–2003), British entrepreneur
