= Lachance =

Lachance is a surname. Notable people with the surname include:

- Arthur Lachance (1868–1945), Canadian politician
- Candy LaChance (1870–1932), American professional baseball player
- Claude-André Lachance (born 1954), Canadian lawyer and politician
- Imogen LaChance (1853-1938), American social reformer
- Michel Lachance (born 1955), Canadian professional hockey player
- Scott Lachance (born 1972), American professional hockey player
- Walter William LaChance (1870–1951), Canadian architect
