= Azuma Moriya =

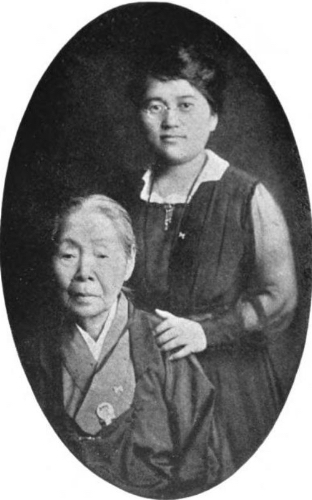
- Azuma Moriya, standing, with Yajima Kajiko, from a 1923 publication.
- Born: July 7, 1884; Shitaya, Taitō, Tokyo, Japan
- Died: December 18, 1975 (aged 91)
- Other names: Moriya Azuma
- Occupation: temperance worker

Azuma Moriya (守屋東, Morira Azuma; 1884 – 1975) was a Japanese temperance activist. She was head of the Loyal Temperance Legion program in Japan, the Woman's Christian Temperance Union (WCTU) outreach to children.

== Early life ==
Azuma Moriya was born in 1884.

== Career ==
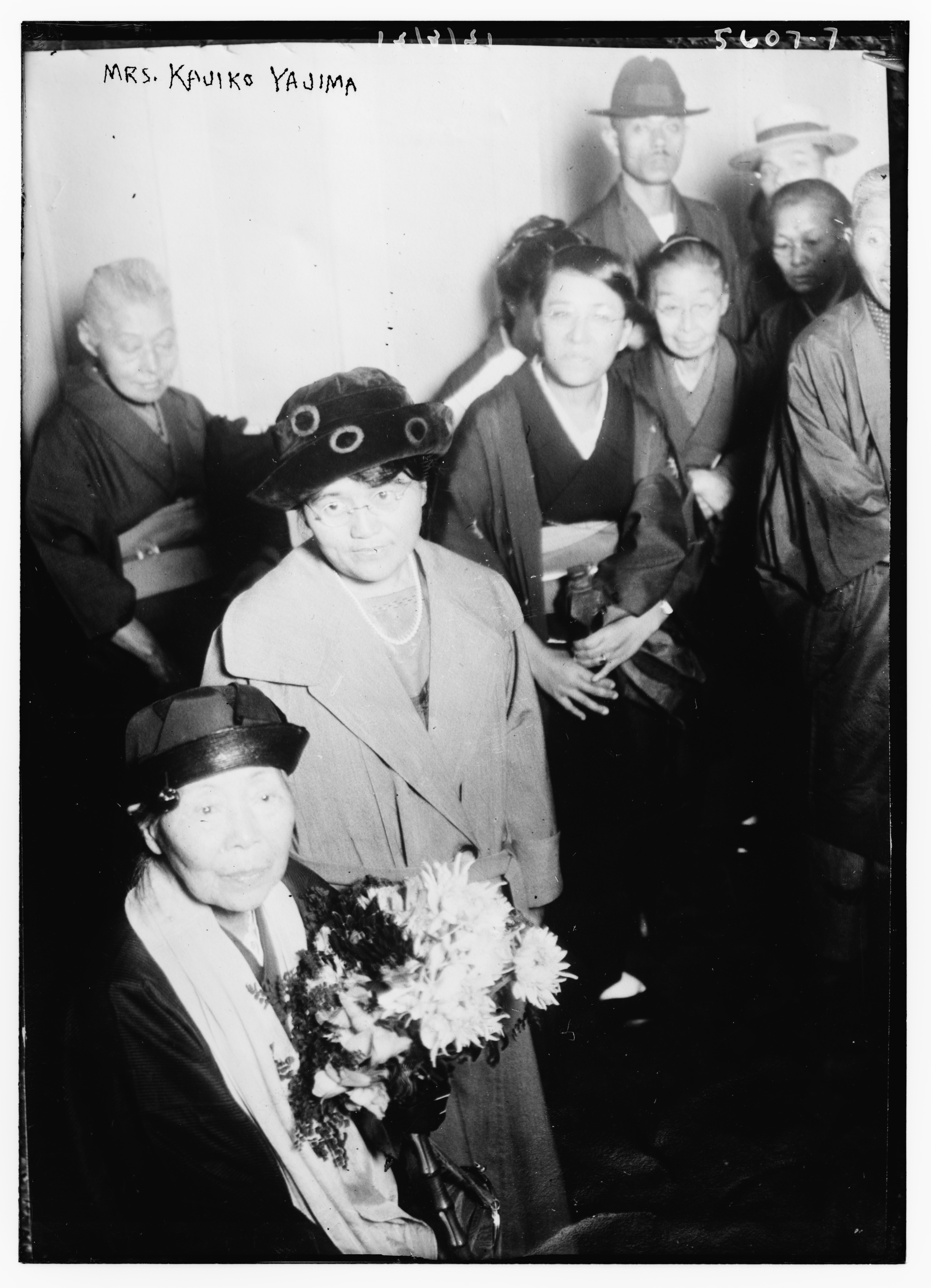
A news photograph of Yajima Kajiko (lower left) and Azuma Moriya, standing next to her, in Washington, D.C., in 1921, from the Library of Congress.

=== Temperance ===
Moriya was secretary and traveling assistant to temperance activist Yajima Kajiko, first president of the WCTU in Japan. In 1908, Moriya was appointed Japanese national chair of the Loyal Temperance Legion (Shonen Kinshu Gun) program, the WCTU's outreach to children. She organized at least 65 chapters of the organization in Japan. "Everywhere she goes," commented a 1918 report, "legions spring up to bless Japan – not only today but in years to come." She organized a temperance conference for students in 1921, and in 1924 began a campaign to provide temperance resources such as posters and pamphlets to primary schools. In 1927 she attended the World Convention of the WCTU in Edinburgh. In 1939 she served on the board of the WCTU in Japan, working with chair Utako Hiyashi and vice-chair Tsuneko Gauntlett.

=== Other causes ===
Moriya traveled to Washington, D.C., with Yajima and Chiyo Kozaki in 1921, to meet with president Warren G. Harding and deliver a petition on disarmament signed by over 10,000 Japanese women. In 1922, Moriya became director of the Jiaikan, a Christian rescue home for women escaping prostitution. She also ran a summer camp and a home for delinquent children. In 1927, she traveled to Singapore to rescue women from sex work, saying "The more we cry for the abolition of licensed prostitution and the traffic of prostitutes abroad, the more we need a place to help and rehabilitate such women." She also visited Shanghai during that project.

In 1952, she was head of Chiisai Hoshi Kai, a Japanese women's organization for the welfare of prisoners and parolees. In 1955, Azuma Moriya was described as the leader of the Women's Public Welfare Movement when she attended a royal reception for Helen Keller in Tokyo.

== Personal life ==
Azuma Moriya took temporary custody of two girls from Pohnpei, arranging for their schooling in Japan before they returned to the island as teachers. She died in 1975, aged 91 years.
