= Sasaki Toyoju =

Japanese activist (1853–1901)

Toyoju Sasaki
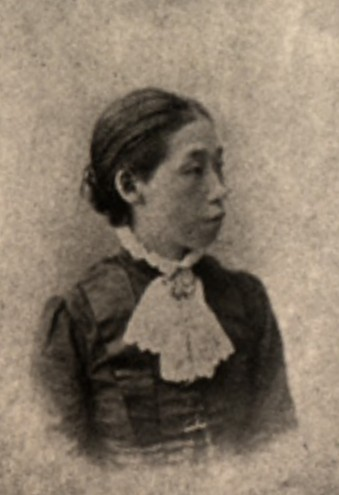
- Born: May 6, 1853; Sendai
- Died: June 15, 1901 (aged 48)

Sasaki Toyoju (Japanese: 佐々城 豊寿; born 6 May 1853 in Sendai, Mutsu Province; died 15 June 1901) was a Japanese feminist, temperance worker and anti-prostitution activist.

== Early life ==
Sasaki Toyoju was born Hoshi Toyoshi, the daughter of Hoshi Yūki (星雄記), a senior samurai of the Nambu clan. Her parents sent her to Tokyo, where she attended a private school, to learn English. Historian Elizabeth Dorn Lublin described Sasaki's education as more like that given to boys, than girls, in this period, and it gave her exceptional assertiveness, which came to the fore in later power struggles.

== Activism ==
In 1886 she cooperated with Yajima Kajiko in founding the association of the Women's Christian Temperance Union in Japan (東京婦人矯風会, Tōkyō fujin kyōfūkai), which advocated the abolition of prostitution and abstinence from alcohol. On 6 December 1886 she was selected as secretary of the group.

However, Sasaki believed that prostitution was a more serious issue than alcohol abuse and used her influence to steer the WCTU towards greater focus on the issue, leading to a power struggle with the founder Yajima. She was on the editorial board of the organisation's magazine, Fujin kyofu zasshi, alongside Wakamatsu Shizuko, Asai Saku and Honda Teiko. Sasaki also translated the American WCTU work Women’s Freedom of Speech to Japanese, with prefaces by Tokutomi Soho, Iwamoto Yoshiharu and Sasaki herself. She also led the organisation's Women's White Ribbon Club.

== Family ==
Sasaki was the aunt of the restaurateur and artist's patron Kokkō Sōma (1876–1955). She also had a daughter, Nobuko (佐々城 信子; 1878-1949), who was the inspiration for the heroine in the novel Aru Onna by Arishima Takeo.
