= Harriet Ball Dunlap =

American temperance leader

- Born: Harriet Elizabeth Ball; June 1, 1867; Harrison, Ohio, U.S.
- Died: December 15, 1957; Mount Vernon, Washington, U.S.
- Occupations: Woman's Christian Temperance Union; Loyal Temperance Legion
- Movement: temperance
- Spouses: A. C. Williams (m. 1887); Samuel Dunlap (m. 1895)

Harriet Ball Dunlap (née, Ball; after first marriage, Williams; after second marriage, Dunlap; June 1, 1867 – December 15, 1957) was an American temperance leader associated with Western Washington.

== Biography ==
Harriet Elizabeth Ball was born at Harrison, Ohio, June 1, 1867. Her parents were Richard Henry Ball (1844-1934) and Amanda Virginia (Horney) Ball (1847-1934). Harriet had five younger siblings: Rebecca, Samuel, Ruth, Mary, and Richard. The family removed to La Conner, Skagit County, Washington in 1876.

She was educated in the public schools of the Washington Territory.

In 1887, she married A. C. Williams. In 1895, she married Samuel Dunlap, of Mount Vernon, Skagit County, Washington.

Early on, she took a position among the pioneer teachers in Western Washington.

There, too, she began working for the temperance cause, having been a member of the Woman's Christian Temperance Union (W. C. T. U.) from her childhood. For a period of thirteen years (1898-1911), she was State secretary of the Loyal Temperance Legion of West Washington W. C. T. U. During a portion of that period, and for some years afterward, she was president and leader of the work in Skagit County, holding that position until 1916, when she was elected State president of the Washington W. C. T. U. It was during that year that the Washington State Prohibition Law, 1914, went into effect, encountering the opposition of the traffic in two initiated measures intended to confuse and divide the voters. This move was far more dangerous than any direct attack could have been, and the call was urgent for another campaign of public meetings and large expenditures for speakers and literature to thwart this approach. The W. C. T. U. took an active part in the defensive campaign under the leadership of Dunlap. The brewers were defeated by an overwhelming majority. During the same year, the W. C. T. U. built and equipped a new White Shield Home, a maternity hospital for unwed mothers, in Tacoma, Washington.

After retiring from the State presidency, Dunlap continued in active work for the W. C. T. U., serving as corresponding secretary of the West Washington W. C. T. U. Also, with the exception of the two years during which she was president of the West Washington W. C. T. U., she served as president of Skagit County W. C. T. U., the second largest county organization in the State.

Harriet Ball Dunlap died at Mount Vernon, Washington, December 15, 1957.
