= Candy LaChance =

American baseball player (1870–1932)

- First baseman
- Born: February 14, 1870; Putnam, Connecticut, U.S.
- Died: August 18, 1932 (aged 62); Waterville, Connecticut, U.S.
- Batted: Switch Threw: Right

MLB debut
- August 15, 1893, for the Brooklyn Grooms

Last MLB appearance
- April 28, 1905, for the Boston Americans

MLB statistics
- Batting average: .280
- Home runs: 39
- Runs batted in: 693
- Stats at Baseball Reference

Teams
- Brooklyn Grooms / Bridegrooms (1893–1898); Baltimore Orioles (1899); Cleveland Blues (1901); Boston Americans (1902–1905)

Career highlights and awards
- World Series champion (1903)

George Joseph "Candy" LaChance (February 14, 1870 – August 18, 1932) was an American professional baseball first baseman. He played twelve seasons in Major League Baseball (MLB) between 1893 and 1905 for the Brooklyn Grooms / Bridegrooms, Baltimore Orioles, Cleveland Blues, and Boston Americans.

LaChance reached the majors in 1893, spending six years with the Brooklyn Grooms / Bridegrooms before moving to the Baltimore Orioles (1899), Cleveland Blues (1901) and Boston Americans (1902–05). He hit .300 or more five times, and from 1894 to 1899 averaged 26 stolen bases each year, with a career-high 37 in 1895. In that season he also led the National League hitters with 108 RBI, while hitting .312 with 38 extra-bases and 99 runs. While in Boston in 1903, he was a member of the first World Champion team in major league history.

In a 12-season career, LaChance was a .280 hitter (1380-for-4928) with 39 home runs and 693 RBI in 1265 games, including 681 runs, 198 doubles, 87 triples and 192 stolen bases. Later he played with Montreal and Providence in the International League and for Waterbury and New Haven in the Connecticut League. LaChance earned the nickname of "Candy" because he preferred to chew on peppermints rather than chewing tobacco.

LaChance died in Waterville, Connecticut at the age of 62.
