= Hayashi Utako =

Japanese educator and social worker

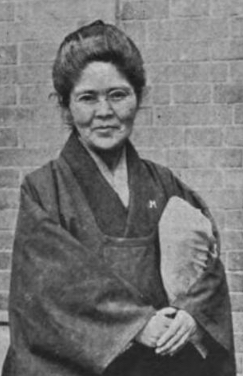
- Hayashi Utako, from a 1921 publication.
- Born: January 11, 1865; Ōno, Fukui, Japan
- Died: March 24, 1946 (aged 81); Osaka
- Occupations: teacher, activist, social worker
- Years active: 1896-1946
- Known for: Temperance work, and active in international peace movement

Hayashi Utako (林歌子; January 11, 1865 – March 24, 1946; some sources give 1864 as the birth year) was a Japanese educator and social worker. As head of the Osaka branch of the Woman's Christian Temperance Union, she led campaigns against businesses serving alcohol in 1909, 1912, and 1916. She was also active in the international woman's peace movement.

== Early life ==
Hayashi was born in Ōno, Fukui, daughter of a samurai. She trained as a teacher and converted to Christianity in 1887, influenced by the preaching of Tokyo's Anglican bishop, Channing Moore Williams.

== Career ==
=== Schools ===
Hayashi taught at the Episcopal Girls' School of Tokyo as a young woman. She also taught Japanese to foreign missionaries. She became head of the Osaka Hakuaisha Orphanage from 1896, famous for her self-sacrifice in supplying the children of the orphanage with food.

=== Temperance ===
Hayashi was president of the Osaka branch of the Woman's Christian Temperance Union (WCTU) from its founding in 1899. In 1907 she opened the Osaka Women's Home, to house working women in the city. She led campaigns against alcohol and prostitution in the Osaka's Sonezaki district in 1909, with further campaigns in 1912 and 1916. In 1922 she and Kubushiro Ochimi attended the World WCTU convention in Philadelphia, Pennsylvania. "Next to Mrs. Yajima, the greatest woman in the anti-vice movement is Miss Utako Hayashi," explained an American writer in 1923. Another American visitor called her the "Frances Willard of Japan."

=== Peace ===
Hayashi attended the fifth Conference on the Cause and Cure of War, held in Washington D.C. in January 1930, and the London Naval Conference the following month, in the delegation led by Yajima Kajiko. She and Tsuneko Gauntlett presented a petition to British prime minister Ramsay MacDonald, on behalf of the Women's Peace Association of Japan. "We must not only become mothers who care for our own children", she said, "but also become mothers who care for children of the world, wives, older and younger sisters. And we have to recognize that the second restoration must be carried out by women".

As late as 1945, she was listed as president of the Japan WCTU, and of the Japan Christian Women's League.

== Personal life ==
Hayashi was married and divorced when she was a young woman. Kanno Sugako described Hayashi as her "spiritual mother". Hayashi died in 1946, aged 81 years, at a care home in Osaka.
