= Elizabeth J. Smith =

Canadian-born American temperance activist; newspaper editor, publisher (b. 1842)

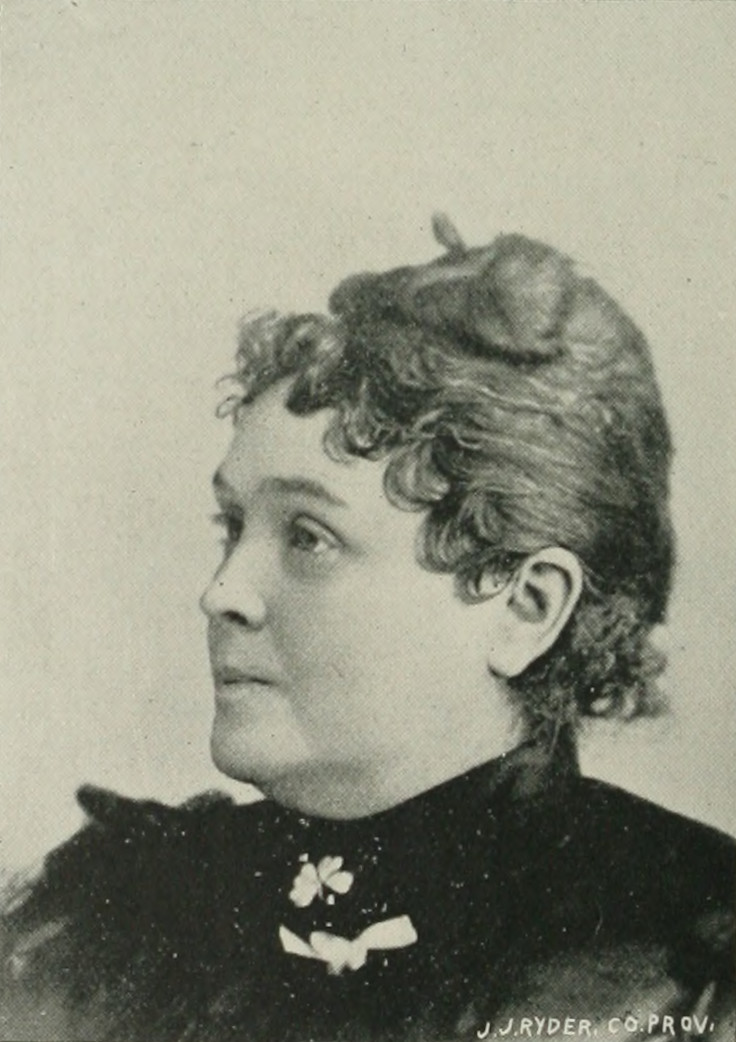
- Portrait in A Woman of the Century. Photo by J. J. Ryder Co. Providence, Rhode Island.
- Born: Eliza Jane Corscaden; 1842; Suburb of Saint John, New Brunswick, Canada
- Died: July 6, 1900; Providence, Rhode Island, U.S.
- Occupation: social reformer; newspaper editor and publisher
- Genre: Newspaper
- Subject: Temperance
- Literary movement: temperance movement
- Notable works: Home Guard
- Spouse: Ransom L. Smith (m. 1861; died 1863)

Elizabeth J. Smith (née, Corscaden; 1842 – July 6, 1900) was a Canadian-born American social reformer and newspaper editor and publisher in Rhode Island. Involved in the Woman's Christian Temperance Union (WCTU), she was particularly engaged with the youth of the temperance movement through the Loyal Temperance Legion. Smith served as editor and publisher of its organ, the Home Guard.

== Biography ==
Eliza Jane Corscaden was born in a suburb of Saint John, New Brunswick, in 1842. Her parents were Robert Corscaden (b. 1811) and Eliza R. (b. 1822). She was descended from a Scotch ancestry distinguished for scholarly attainments and spirituality; on her father's side from the Scotch covenanters, and from a maternal line marked in every generation, back to the Crusaders. There were three younger siblings: Thomas (b. 1845), Maria (b. 1847), and Robert (b. 1849).

On the removal of her parents to Providence, Rhode Island when Eliza was eight, she entered classes with pupils several years her senior. At fourteen, she was a teacher in one of the public schools and became its principal at sixteen.

After a conversion, she united with the Chestnut Street Methodist Episcopal Church and became a member. At the age of thirteen, she became a Sunday school teacher.

In 1861, at the age of 18, she married Ransom L. Smith (1842-1863), of Winchester, New Hampshire, and two years later, was widowed. Her husband's name was included on the Battle Monument at West Point, New York.

Returning to her parents' home, she decided not to continue teaching music and voice culture but instead, entered into the work of a religious evangelist. Showing a marked aptitude for pulpit work, she delivered sermons nightly for successive weeks to crowded audiences. Large numbers of converts were added to the churches where she spoke.

In 1886, Smith planned to commence a series of winter engagements in New England churches after her return from a National WCTU meeting to which she was a delegate. However, an attack of pneumonia laid her up for some time. During her convalescence, she thought about channeling her influence towards the young. In addition to her other work, she filled the position of State superintendent of juvenile work in the Rhode Island WCTU for over 12 years and established the Loyal Temperance Legion, before it was made national. That organization flourished under her care. Her desire to interest young people in temperance work culminated in the publication of an eight-page illustrated paper, the Home Guard, which increased to 12 pages. Its extensive circulation all over the U.S., in Sunday schools of every denomination, demanded her time and efforts as its editor and publisher.

In 1891, she was chosen as vice-president of Providence County for the Rhode Island WCTU. When the effort was made to secure constitutional prohibition in Rhode Island, Smith, as a State lecturer, gave effective addresses in nearly every town and city of the State.

Smith resided in Providence, Rhode Island for over four decades, and died there July 6, 1900.
