= Loyal Temperance Legion =

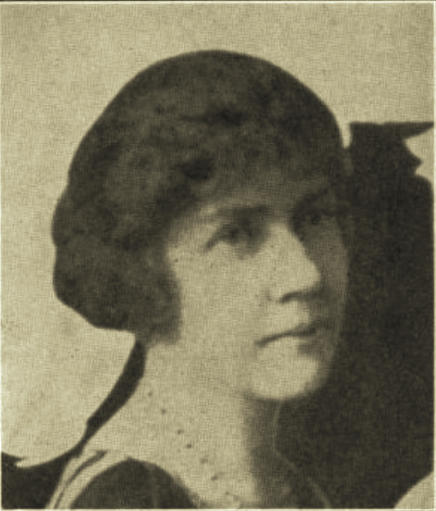
Mary B. Ervin, General Secretary, Loyal Temperance Legion

The Loyal Temperance Legion (L.T.L.) was the children's branch of the Woman's Christian Temperance Union (W.C.T.U.). Its slogan was "Tremble, King Alcohol, We Shall Grow Up". It published an English-language newspaper for children called The Young Crusader, which was edited for some time by W.C.T.U. president Anna Adams Gordon, a strong believer in the need to interest children in temperance at a very early age.

== Notable people ==
- Suessa Baldridge Blaine (1860-1932), general secretary of the Loyal Temperance Legion
- Harriet Ball Dunlap (1867-1957), State secretary of the Loyal Temperance Legion of West Washington WCTU
- Anna Adams Gordon (1853–1931), editor, The Young Crusader
- Imogen LaChance (1853-1938), organized and superintended Senior and Junior Loyal Temperance Legion in Wisconsin
- Azuma Moriya (1884–1975), head, Loyal Temperance Legion program in Japan
- Elizabeth J. Smith (1842-?), editor, Home Guard
- Minnie Welch (1871-1962), superintendent, local branch of the Loyal Temperance Legion; President, WCTU of Tennessee
