= Imogen LaChance =

American social reformer

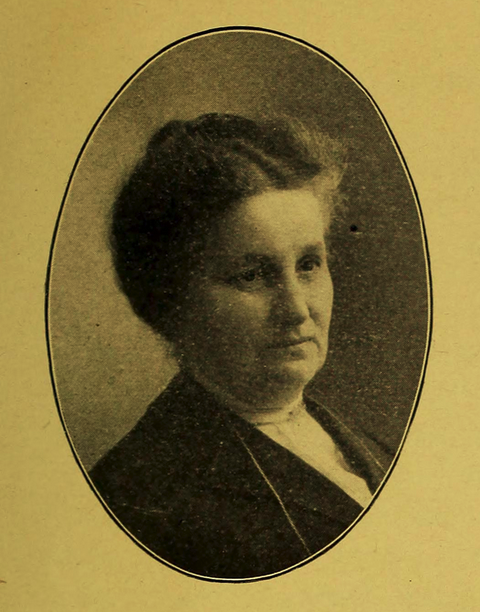
- LaChance, c. 1908
- Born: Imogen (or Imogene) Florence Hanscom; November 22, 1853; Sheboygan, Wisconsin, U.S.
- Died: August 1938; California, U.S.
- Occupations: social reformer; organizational leader
- Organization: Woman's Christian Temperance Union
- Movement: temperance
- Spouse: Leander LaChance (m. 1872; died 1910)
- Children: 3

Imogen Florence LaChance (née Hanscom; November 22, 1853 – August 1938) was an American social reformer active in the temperance movement for 60 years. She served as president of the Arizona State Woman's Christian Temperance Union (W.C.T.U.). She was also an advocate of woman suffrage and gained a wide acquaintance throughout Arizona as a result of her activity in various movements.

== Early life and education ==
Imogen (or Imogene) Florence Hanscom was born in Sheboygan, Wisconsin, November 22, 1853. Her father, Dudley Marvin Hanscom (1821-1862), a prominent merchant of that city, died when she was seven years old. Four years later, her mother, Elizabeth (nee Pickering; 1830-1916), married Professor William Owen Butler (1829-1913), principal of one of the schools of Sheboygan at that time.

Butler took charge of LaChance's education.

== Career ==
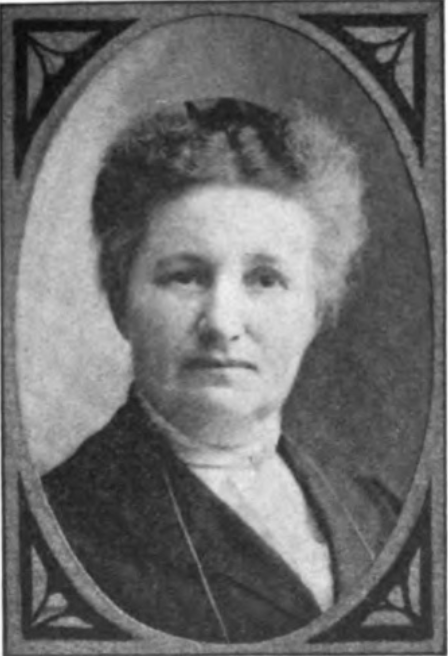
(1913)

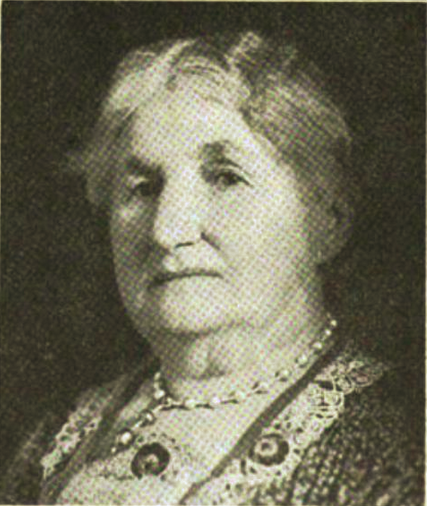
(1928)

LaChance became a teacher, serving in Wausau, Wisconsin during the period of 1870–72. On March 24, 1872, in Wausau, she married Leander LaChance (1842-1910), a merchant of Wausau. In that city, the couple joined the Independent Order of Good Templars.

In 1877, they moved to Chicago, where she became interested in W.C.T.U. work. After uniting with the Chicago Central W.C.T.U., LaChance worked with Frances Willard, assisting in the mission work at Bethel Home and at Des Plaines. In 1887, they moved to Merrill, Wisconsin, and there she organized and superintended Senior and Junior Loyal Temperance Legion as well as serving as president of the local W.C.T.U.

They came to the Arizona Territory in 1895, where LaChance worked in the interest of temperance. In 1900, she was elected to the office of Arizona territorial president, holding the office till 1912. In 1914, she was elected president of the Arizona state W.C.T.U., holding that office until she retired in 1923. Under her leadership, the work prospered, LaChance being a firm believer in the principles of temperance and the final prohibition of the liquor traffic. For many years, particularly while serving as State President, she gave to the work her attention, time and money. At retirement, she was given the title of president emeritus of the state's W.C.T.U.

She was also an ardent advocate of women's suffrage, believing that all taxpayers should have the right to vote.

== Personal life ==
Mr. and Mrs. LaChance had three children, Marie, Ethel and Leander.

She lived in Phoenix, Arizona since 1895.

In failing health the last two years of her life, Imogen LaChance died at her daughter's home in California, August 1938.
