= Yajima Kajiko =

Japanese temperance activist

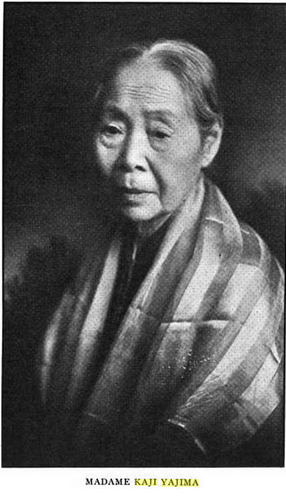
Kaji Yajima, from a 1921 publication

Yajima Kajiko (矢嶋 楫子; 1833 – June 16, 1925) was the founder of the Women's Reform Society and president of Japan's Woman's Christian Temperance Union. An educator, pacifist, and Christian activist, she vigorously advanced the cause for the education of women in Japan. Her name was usually seen as Kaji Yajima in the American press of her day.

Yajima worked with Sasaki Toyoju, the secretary of Japan's WCTU. Together they attempted to advocate the reform of feudalistic customs which subjugated Japan to the West and women to men. Yajima in particular advocated for temperance due to her brief marriage to an alcoholic. Both worked towards the elimination of prostitution, as well as the elimination of geisha culture and concubinage. Late in life, Yajima attended international meetings on peace and temperance, and met with American suffragists.

== Early life ==
Yajima was born in 1833, in Kumamoto, Japan and was the sixth child and fifth daughter of an influential farmer's family. As a girl instead of a boy her parents had little interest in her. Elizabeth Dorn Lublin wrote "the ideology of danson johi (respect men and despise women) that informed this reception remained the dominant shaping force in Yajima's early years". She had a traditional female education and it was not until she was twenty-five that she married a samurai named Hayashi Shichiro. Hayashi enjoyed sake and would become abusive when drunk. Yajima later left her husband and returned to her family, refusing to return and cutting her hair. Eventually she moved to Tokyo to take care of her brother. Since teaching was one of the few paying jobs available to women of her time, she became a teacher for the newly established public school system in Tokyo following her divorce. She later transferred to the Presbyterian mission school because it provided her with twice the income as her position with the Tokyo school system. It was during this time that she was drawn to Christianity and would eventually begin working with a Presbyterian missionary by the name of Maria True.

== Career ==
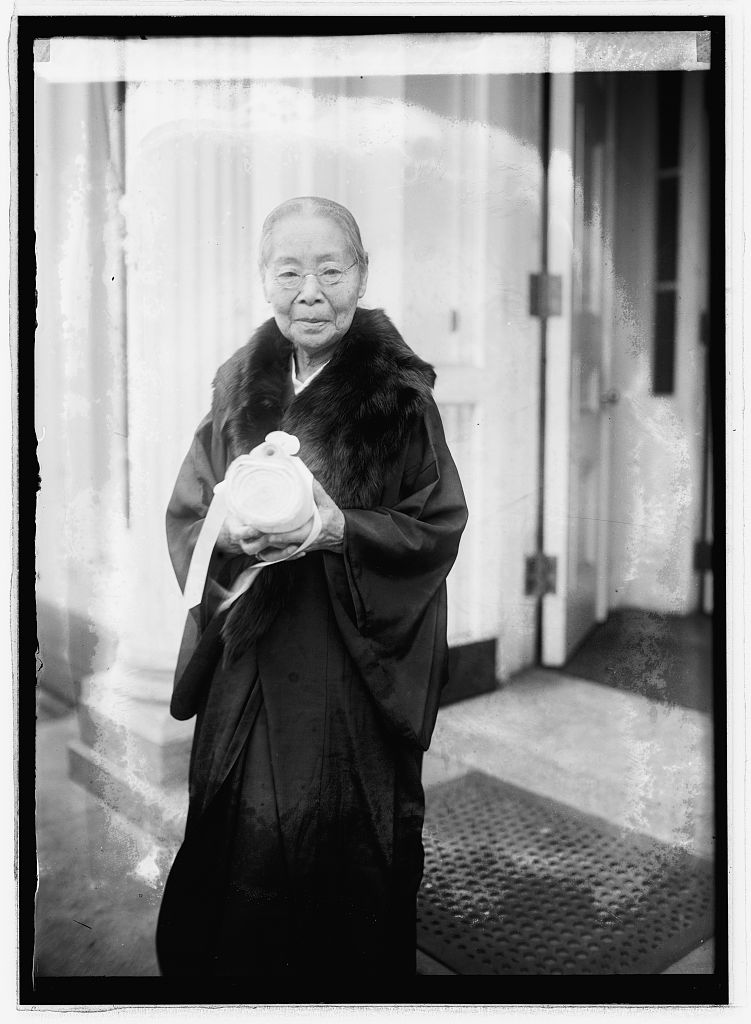
Kaji Yajima in 1921, from the Library of Congress.

=== Teaching ===
Kaji Yajima was headmistress of a Presbyterian mission school for girls in Tokyo, for forty years.

=== Women’s Christian Temperance Movement ===
In June 1886, the missionary Mary Clement Leavitt came to Japan. Her lectures were standing-room-only and influenced Yajima to start a union. In late 1886, Yajima helped create the Tokyo Woman's Christian Temperance Movement (WCTU) along with twenty-eight other women and was appointed president along with Sasaki Toyoju as secretary.

The abuse at the hands of her husband and witnessing struggles of students with alcoholic fathers instilled in Yajima a strong dislike of alcohol and an interest in temperance. She pushed for the word temperance (kinshu) should be in the name of the Tokyo WCTU as a result of her past. The different histories of the secretary and Yajima was a source of conflict between the two. Yajima was more traditional in her views and believed that temperance was the most important problem the WCTU needed to address. She maintained that the members should "assist their husbands in the home [and] help gentlemen in society". Sasaki, on the other hand, thought that prostitution should be the focus of the union, causing the two to fight for control instead of work together.

Yajima maintained the presidency until an accident forced her to resign in 1889. Three years later she was able to be reelected and stepped back into her role until 1903 she was forced to leave position yet again, this time because she did not receive enough votes from union members. This only lasted a matter of months as the woman who replaced her died and Yajima took her place. It was not until 1921 that Yajima left the presidency permanently. She edited the Japanese temperance newspaper, lectured, led protest marches, raised funds and represented Japan at international conferences.

=== International profile ===
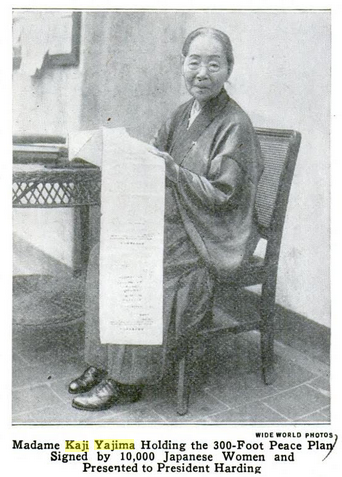
Kaji Yajima displaying the peace petition she presented to President Warren G. Harding in 1921; from a 1922 publication.

Her leadership position took her abroad in her seventies and eighties. In 1906, she spoke at the world convention of the WCTU in Boston; on that trip she also visited New York, Philadelphia, Pittsburgh, Chicago, and San Francisco, and went to the White House with other temperance activists to meet president Theodore Roosevelt. In 1920, with her countrywomen Tsuneko Yamada Gauntlett and Michiko Kawai, she traveled to London and Geneva for international conferences on temperance and suffrage, respectively. In 1921, Kaji Yajima traveled at her own expense to the Washington, D.C. for the Conference for the Limitation of Armaments, with her assistant Azuma Moriya. She met with American suffragists, and with President Warren G. Harding, to whom she delivered a 300-foot-long peace petition signed by Japanese women. Prince Tokugawa held a reception in her honor at the conference. On the same trip, she visited New York City to address the Friends' Foreign Missionary Association, Presbyterian mission board, and the Young Women's Christian Association.

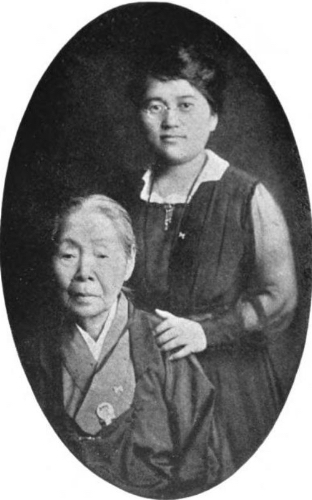
Yajima Kajiko with her secretary, temperance worker Azuma Moriya, from a 1923 publication.

Her 1921 visit to the United States was covered by many American newspapers and magazines; she took the opportunity to express her hopes for world peace: "When I am gone, remember that I stood here looking into your faces expressing the hope that you will do all that is in your power as this old body will, that the world may know peace from now on. We have come to the time when we not only want peace, but know we must have it." In her message to the "Christian women of America", Kaji Yajima assured her audience that "the women of Japan want education, not battleships or armies. They want the government to spend money, not on military establishments, but on schools."

== Personal life and legacy ==
Yajima was married unhappily and had three children; she left her alcoholic husband by age 40, and converted to Christianity in midlife; she was baptized as a Presbyterian at age 45. She survived the 1923 Great Kantō earthquake, and died in 1925, aged 93 years.

While in Tokyo, Yajima had a baby out of wedlock. Instead of marrying the father, she kept the birth a secret, giving the baby to a farming family before adopting the child back later and raising her as an adopted daughter on her own with her own salary. This part of her life was kept a secret until after her death.

After her death, the building housing the offices of the Japanese WCTU was named for Yajima. In the 1950s, her biography was presented in American Christian literature as a tale of second starts, and triumph over obstacles. Her great-grandson, Yo Yuasa, was a prominent doctor in the treatment of leprosy. Her grand-niece, suffragist Kubushiro Ochimi, was also president of the Japanese WCTU.

== Other sources ==
- Yasutake, R. (2004). Transnational women's activism: the United States, Japan, and Japanese Immigrant Communities in California, 1859-1920. New York: NYU Press.
