= George Edward Luckman Gauntlett =

English teacher in Japan (1868–1956)

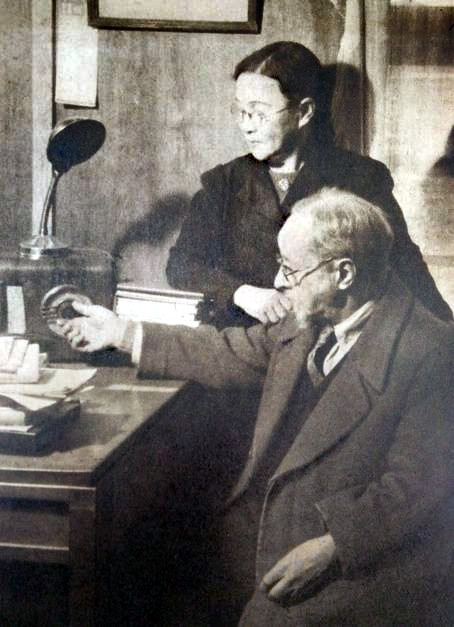
- Edward and Tsuneko Gauntlett in 1949
- Born: 4 December 1868; Swansea, Wales
- Died: 29 July 1956 (aged 87); Tokyo, Japan
- Occupation: Linguist
- Spouse: Tsuneko Gauntlett (m. 1898; died 1953)
- Children: 6
- Relatives: Kosaku Yamada (brother-in-law)

George Edward Luckman Gauntlett (4 December 1868 – 29 July 1956) was a teacher of English and educator in Japan.

== Biography ==
George Edward Luckman Gauntlett was born on 4 December 1868 in Swansea, Wales. After completing his primary education in Pershore, in Worcestershire. He went on to Brighton Grammar School as a boarder for his secondary education, and to London where he entered a Music College. It is also said that he studied architecture, electricity, surveying, the arts, etc.

In spite of his parents' objections, he went to the United States of America at the age of 20. From there he went to Canada, where he joined a church.

He went to Japan in 1890 or 1891 as a missionary for his Canadian church. Before leaving North America from Seattle, he obtained employment at the American Embassy in Tokyo so that he had paid work waiting for him on his arrival. In Japan, he taught English at several schools in the Tokyo area (Tokyo Commercial College, Azabu Middle School, Chiba Middle School) before he resettled to Okayama, where he taught at the Nr. 6 College. While in Okayama, Edward and his brother-in-law, Yamada Kosaku, introduced table tennis to Japan. There is a small private museum near the railway station that commemorates the event. Four years later, he moved on, this time to Kanazawa, where he taught English at the Nr. 4 College.

Six years later, he went to Yamaguchi, where he taught at the Yamaguchi Commercial College (stayed there for 8 years). While in Yamaguchi, the world-famous 'Shuhodo" limestone caverns in Yamaguchi Province, West Japan were explored for the first time in 1911 by Edward. At the time the caverns were accessible only through a natural hole in the "roof" so he had some students lower him in a basket via a long rope. He used pine torches, mapped the extensive system of caverns, and reported his findings to the Royal Geographical Society in Britain. While in America he was impressed with the system of National Parks there so he urged the authorities to advertise the whole area, and years later the entire cave was illuminated and a cement path provided, and the Emperor on his state visit named it "Shuhodo". There is a small museum above the main "hall" accessible by elevator from the hall or by car by road above. In the museum, there is a bust of Edward.

From 1919 to 1936 he taught English and other subjects (among them Latin) in Tokyo at Rikkyō University (St Paul's University).. His most significant teaching was at Hitotosubashi University where many of the members of the Japanese Foreign Office (Gaimusho) learned English from Edward.

He is credited with introducing to Japan the methods on how to teach commercial English. He invented the first Japanese shorthand and was highly accomplished in illuminated texts, and did work for the Crown Prince of Belgium.

While in Okayama, he also taught his students Esperanto, and was one of the founding members of the Japanese Esperanto Society in 1906. In 2007 the Japanese Government published a postage stamp with Mr Gauntlett's portrait on it, commemorating his pioneering of Esperanto in Japan. There is a small museum near Okayama Railway Station (JR) that commemorates the introduction to Japan of Table Tennis by Edward Gauntlett (Japanese name, Ganto Tadashi) and Yamada Kosaku.

Edward imported (from France) and assembled the first pipe organ ever installed in Japan. Being musically gifted too (he was related to the composers William Henry Monk and Henry J Gauntlett, composer of the tune to the Christmas carol "Once in Royal David's City" among other works), he was an organist at the Hongo Central Church, which boasted Japan's biggest pipe organ at the time. He taught Sunday school too.

In 1898, Gauntlett married Tsune Yamada (the eldest sister of composer Kosaku Yamada; there were eight children in the Yamada family. Tsune was the eldest and Kosaku the youngest). When they married, marriages between Japanese and foreigners were not recognised by the Japanese government. On the advice of a Japanese lawyer, all record of Tsune's Japanese nationality had to be expunged and Edward had to petition Queen Victoria to 'adopt' Tsune as a daughter of the British Empire. The petition was successful, and a letter from Queen Victoria arrived in due course. Later, the Japanese government introduce legislation that would legalise marriages between Japanese and foreigners, so Tsune recovered her Japanese identity. It is said that theirs was the first officially registered marriage between a Japanese and a foreign citizen. He and his wife had six children. Their eldest son, John Owen Gauntlett, taught English at Aoyama Gakuin University and was also a flutist. J. O. Gauntlett also gave a set of lectures on teaching English as a foreign language at Nanzan University in Tokyo, that were edited by James A. Noonan and then published as a book by MacMillan Press.

He was a recipient of the Order of the Sacred Treasure, 5th class. He also received the Order of the Rising Sun (see photograph) and was given the civilian rank of Chokunin (literally "Close Friend") and became an official advisor to the Japanese Foreign Office (Gaimusho).

The Emperor vested Mr Gauntlett with Japanese citizenship long before World War 2 and changed his name to Ganto Tadashi 岸登烈 (which is a transliteration of his English name's pronunciation and can be read in Japanese as "Gantoretto" too).

He died at his home in Tokyo of a heart attack, and is buried at the Tama Cemetery.

== Sources ==
- Rainichi Yoseijinmei Jiten revised and enlarged edition, by Hiroshi Takeuchi, Nichigai Associates, 1995
