= History of the Boston Red Sox =

The history of the Boston Red Sox begins in 1901, as one of the original franchises of the American League.

== Early years ==
=== 1900–1909 ===
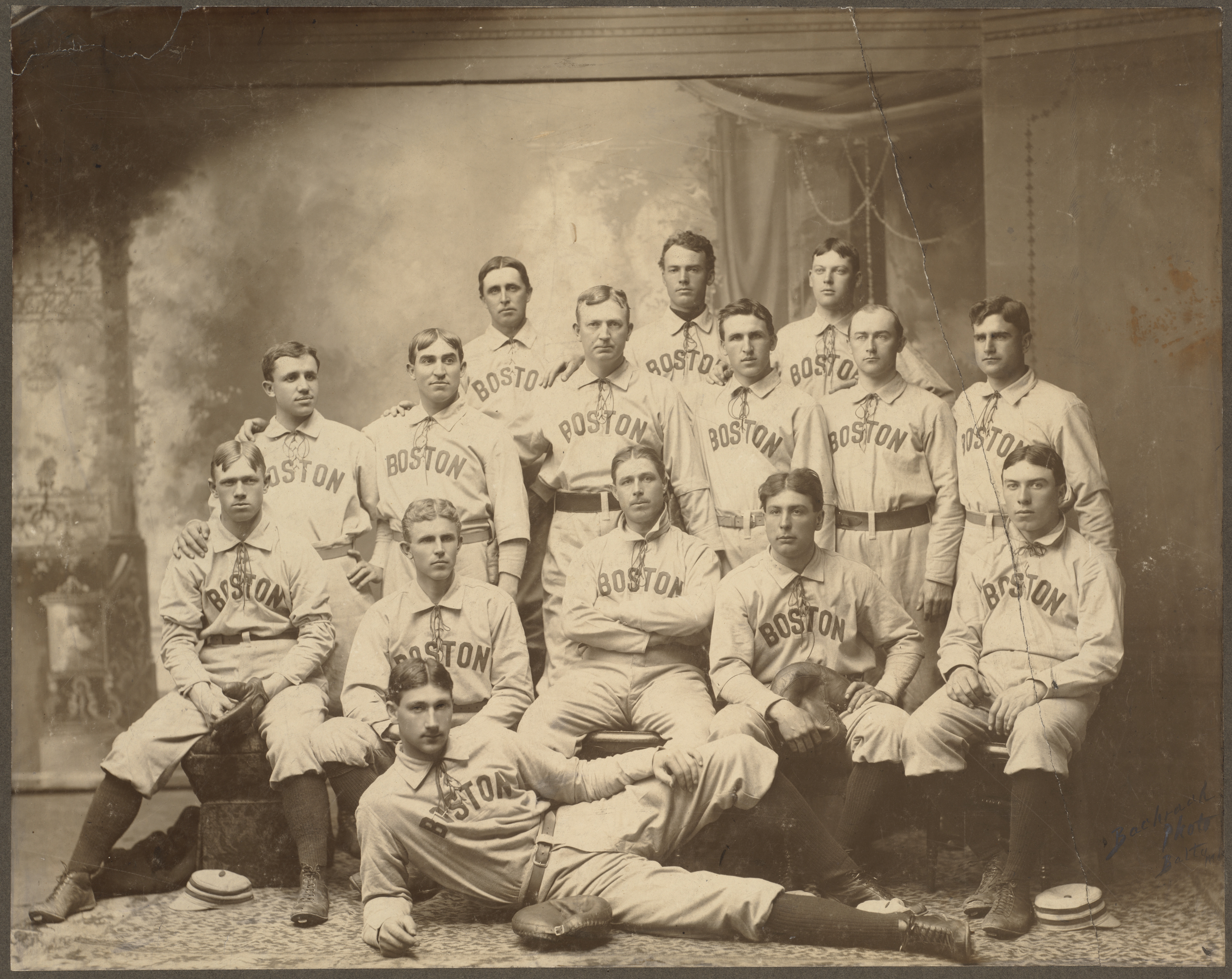
The first Boston American League team taken in 1901

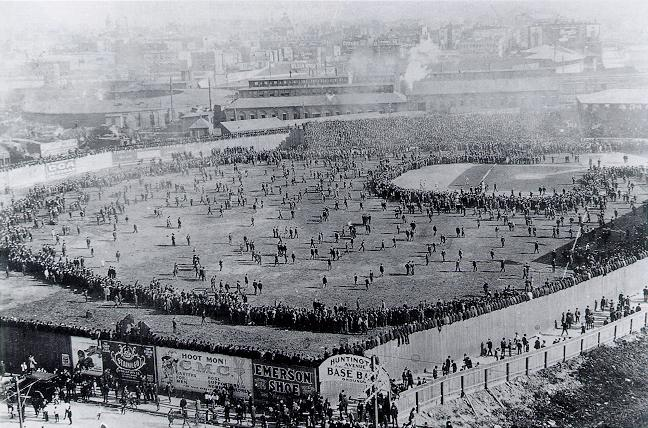
The iconic photo of the Huntington Avenue Grounds before the first modern World Series game in 1903

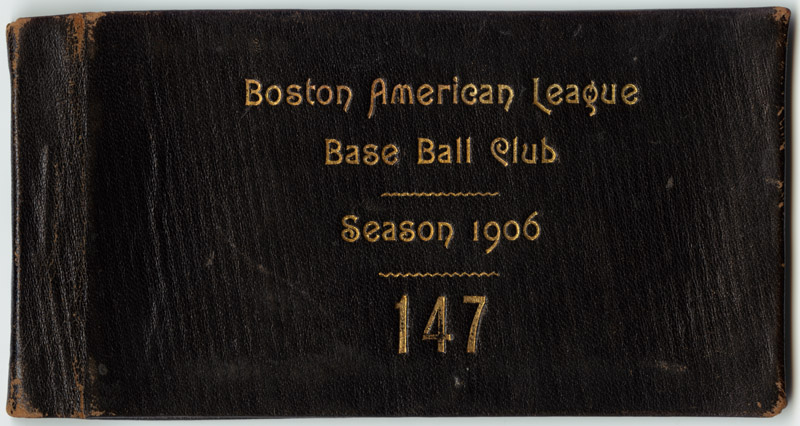
1906 Season pass

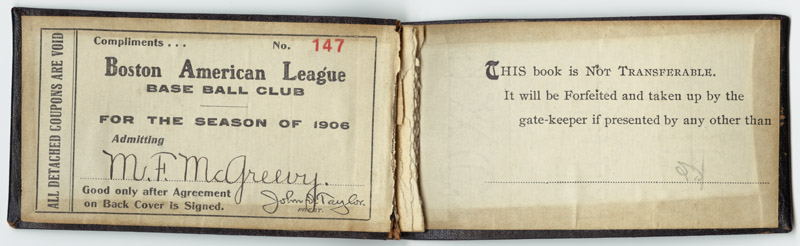
Inside view of the season pass

The Red Sox logo used in 1908

In 1900, Ban Johnson's minor Western League, based in the Midwest, declared its equality with the National League, then the only major league in baseball. Johnson changed the name of his league to the American League. Competing in the streets, the upstart placed franchises in two of the largest and most important NL cities, Philadelphia and Boston. Despite the National League club having been previously well established in the city, beginning play in 1871, the new American League club managed to immediately surpass their in-city rivals in popularity. Factors contributing to this include the signing away of many of the star players from the "Nationals" to the "Americans" to more lucrative contracts, a more accessible location of their home park, animosity between Boston baseball fans and "Nationals" owner Arthur Soden, and more efforts made by the "Americans" to attract the growing Irish-American population to their games, as opposed to the "Nationals" preferring to market themselves more to Anglo-Saxons. Playing their home games at Huntington Avenue Grounds, the Boston franchise (often called the Americans during this time) finished second and third place in their first two seasons before capturing their first pennant in 1903 and repeating the feat in 1904. These early Boston teams were led by manager and star third baseman Jimmy Collins and by pitcher Cy Young, both signings away from the NL club, whose 1901 to 1904 seasons both rank among the best four-year runs ever. In addition, the Americans received significant contributions from outfielders Chick Stahl, Buck Freeman and Patsy Dougherty. In 1903, the Americans participated in the first modern World Series, beating the favored Pittsburgh Pirates and winning the best-of-nine series five games to three. The Americans were aided both by chants of "Tessie" from their Royal Rooters fan club and by their stronger pitching staff.

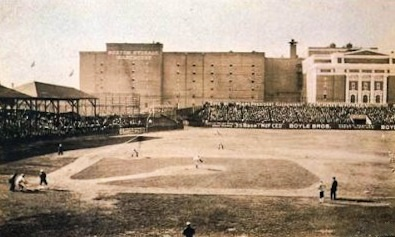
The Huntington Avenue Grounds during a game. Note building from which the famous 1903 "bird's-eye" photo was taken.

The 1904 club was almost as good as the previous year's team, but due to the emergence of the New York Highlanders as a strong contender, the Americans found themselves in a tight pennant race through the last games of the season. Foreshadowing what would eventually become a storied rivalry, the 1904 race featured such controversial moves as the trade of Patsy Dougherty to the Highlanders for Bob Unglaub. However, the arguable climax of the season occurred during the season's final doubleheader at the Highlanders' home stadium, Hilltop Park. In order to win the pennant, New York needed to take both games from Boston. With Jack Chesbro, the Highlanders' 41-game winner, on the mound, New York seemed to have a good chance of winning the first game. However, in the top of the ninth inning with the score tied 2–2 with a man on third in the top of the ninth, a spitball got away from Chesbro allowing Boston's Lou Criger to score the go-ahead run on one of the most famous wild pitches in history. Unfortunately, the NL champion New York Giants had previously declined to play any postseason series, fearing it would give their New York rivals credibility (they had expected the Highlanders to win), but a sharp public reaction led to the two leagues immediately turning the World Series into a permanent championship, starting in 1905.

These successful times quickly ended, as the Americans would finish the 1906 season in last place in the American League with a 49–105 record. But several new star players would soon help the newly renamed Red Sox reverse their fortunes once again.

=== 1910–1919 ===
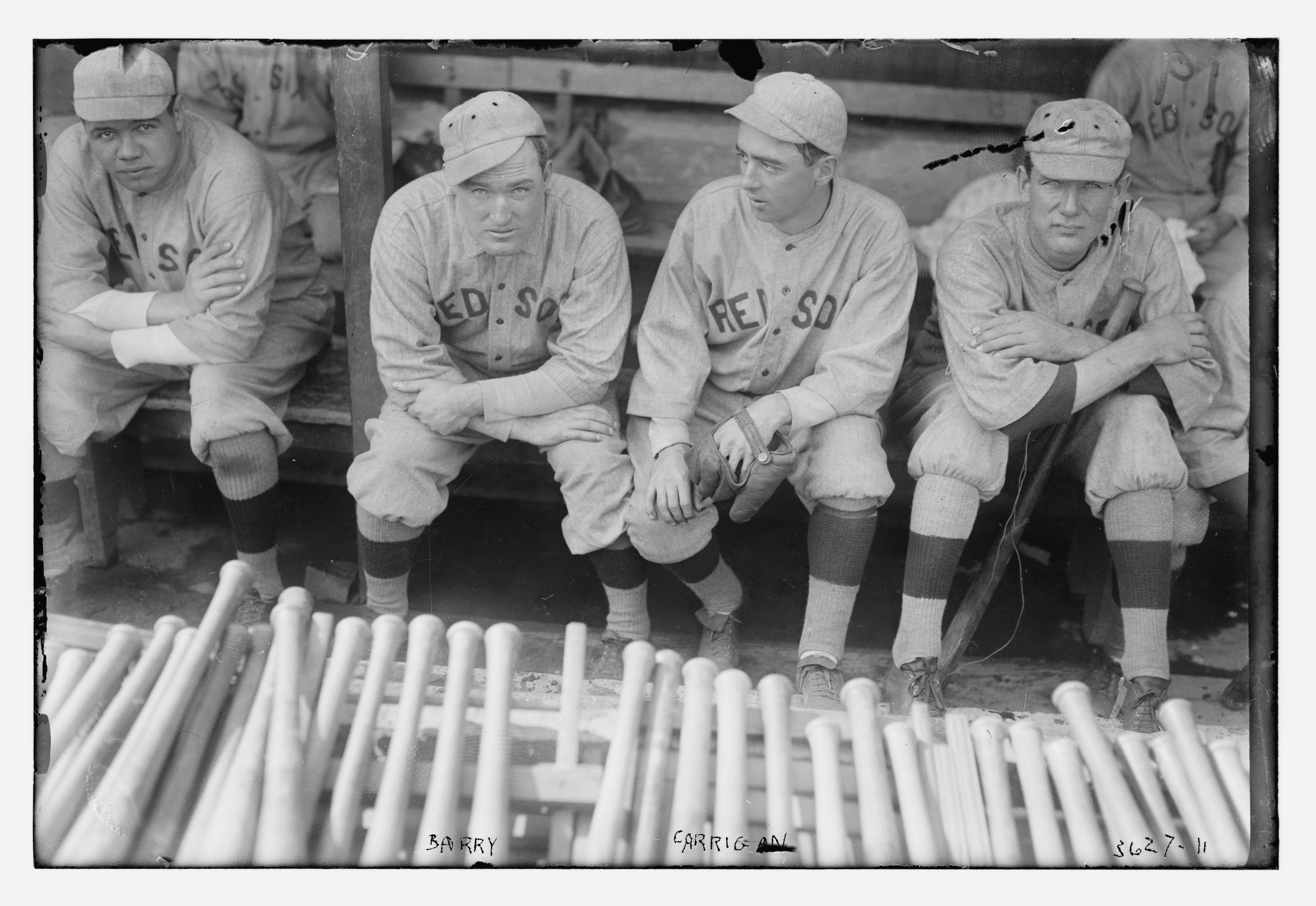
L to R: Babe Ruth, Bill Carrigan, Jack Barry, and Del Gainer (1916)

By 1909, center fielder Tris Speaker had become a fixture in the Boston outfield, and the Red Sox worked their way up to third place in the American League. However, the Red Sox would not win the pennant again until their 105-win 1912 season, finishing with a club-record .691 winning percentage while anchored by an outfield considered to be among the finest in the game (Tris Speaker, Harry Hooper and Duffy Lewis). Boston was also led by superstar pitcher Smoky Joe Wood, with whom the Red Sox beat the New York Giants 4–3–1 in the 1912 World Series that has become best known for "Snodgrass's Muff". From 1913 to 1916, the Red Sox were owned by Joseph Lannin, who signed Babe Ruth, soon to become one of the best-known and most-revered baseball players ever. In Ruth's debut as a pitcher he got a win vs. the Indians, then in 1915 his first major league home run was against the Yankees, who he would ironically play for later in his career. Another 101 wins in 1915 propelled the Red Sox to the 1915 World Series, where they beat the Philadelphia Phillies four games to one. In the 1915 World Series, Harry Hooper hit two home runs, and Duffy Lewis batted .444 with a home run. The 1916 team once again earned the AL pennant, though Tris Speaker was traded to the Cleveland Indians in the off-season. His departure was more than compensated for, however, by the emergence of Babe Ruth as a star pitcher. Once again, the Red Sox won the World Series, this time defeating the Brooklyn Robins. In game two Ruth would pitch a 14 inning complete game victory. Also third baseman Larry Gardner hit a 3-run inside-the-park home run. After the Series, Lannin sold the team to New York theater producer Harry Frazee.

By 1918, the team found itself at the top of the heap again, led by Ruth to another Series championship over the Chicago Cubs. The 1918 victory for Boston was provided by the pitching of Ruth and submarine pitcher Carl Mays.

== Curse of the Bambino ==
=== Sale of Babe Ruth ===
On December 26, 1919, Frazee reached an agreement to sell Babe Ruth to the rival New York Yankees for $125,000. The deal was not officially announced until January 5, 1920. In addition to the $125,000 agreed for Ruth, Frazee was given a loan of a $350,000. Ruth had just broken the single-season home run record, hitting 29 in 1919. Legend has it that Frazee did so in order to finance the Broadway play No, No, Nanette, starring "a friend", but the play did not open on Broadway until 1925 (the play is in fact what paid off the loan).

During that period, the Red Sox, White Sox and Yankees had a détente; they were called "Insurrectos" because their actions antagonized league president Johnson. Although Frazee owned the Red Sox franchise, he did not own Fenway Park (it was owned by the Fenway Park Trust, which was in turn controlled by the Taylors), making his ownership a precarious one; Johnson could move another team into the ballpark. Frazee thus felt the need to purchase the park even though he was in debt (which he did in 1920). Further, providing the Yankees with a box office attraction would help that mediocre club, which had sided with him against Johnson and "the Loyal Five" clubs. He also needed cash to pay on the note he had used to buy the Red Sox from Lannin. Finally, Ruth was considered a serious disciplinary problem, a reputation to be replicated in New York. Frazee moved to stabilize finances and cut distractions. It was a straight sale, no players in return.

The sale of Babe Ruth came to be viewed as the beginning of the Yankees – Red Sox rivalry, described as the "Greatest Rivalry on Earth" by some journalists. The sale would later be attributed as the cause of the "Curse of the Bambino", a tongue-in-cheek curse blamed for the inability of the Red Sox to win the World Series, from 1918 to 2004.

=== 1920–1939 ===
The Red Sox had finished 6th in 1919, only a year after winning the World Series. Frazee intended to use the money from selling Ruth to rebuild the team. However, he ran into trouble with his theater interests from 1918 onward, leaving him without enough money to service the debts on both Fenway Park and the Red Sox. He was thus forced to sell his star players in order to stay afloat. Unfortunately for Frazee, he was all but forced to deal with the Yankees. The "Loyal Five" were still unwilling to deal with him, and the White Sox' image had taken a beating from the Black Sox Scandal, leaving the Yankees as his only realistic trading partner. Over the next three years, Frazee sent nearly all of his star players to the Yankees, earning a total of $305,000.

In the winter of 1920, Wally Schang, future star pitcher Waite Hoyt, Harry Harper, and Mike McNally were traded to the Yankees for Del Pratt, Muddy Ruel, John Costello, Hank Thormahlen, Sammy Vick and cash. The following winter, iron man shortstop Everett Scott, and pitchers Bullet Joe Bush and Sad Sam Jones were traded to the Yankees for Roger Peckinpaugh (who would be immediately shipped to the Washington Senators), Jack Quinn, Rip Collins, Bill Piercy and $50,000. One particularly controversial deal was that of Joe Dugan and Elmer Smith, who were traded to the Yankees on July 23, 1922, for Elmer Miller, Chick Fewster, Johnny Mitchell, and future superstar Lefty O'Doul, who was at the time a mediocre pitching prospect. The trade of Dugan helped the Yankees edge the St. Louis Browns in a tight pennant race, and the resulting uproar helped create a June 15 trading deadline that went into effect the next year. Perhaps an even more outrageous deal was the trade of Herb Pennock, occurring in early 1923. Pennock was traded by the Red Sox to the Yankees for Camp Skinner, Norm McMillan, George Murray and $50,000.

Several notable trades involving Frazee and the Yankees occurred before the Babe Ruth sale. On December 18, 1918, outstanding outfielder Duffy Lewis (mentioned above), pitcher Dutch Leonard, and pitcher Ernie Shore were traded to the Yankees for pitcher Ray Caldwell, Slim Love, Roxy Walters, Frank Gilhooley and $15,000. As all three players were well regarded in Boston—Lewis had been a key player on the 1910s championship teams, Shore had famously relieved Babe Ruth and retired 27 straight, and Leonard had only four years before set a modern record for earned run average—this trade was regarded as not such a good one in Boston. Then, on July 13, 1919, submarine-style pitching star Carl Mays was traded to the Yankees for Bob McGraw, Allan Russell and $40,000. Mays would go on to have several good years for the Yankees.

With the loss of so much talent, the money Frazee earned from these trades was not nearly enough to keep the Red Sox competitive. For the next 14 years, the Red Sox were fixtures in the second division, never finishing closer than 20 games out of first. On July 11, 1923, Frazee sold the team to Bob Quinn for $1,000,000. However, one of Quinn's partners, glass magnate Palmer Winslow, largely withdrew from financing the team in 1924 due to an illness that would ultimately kill him in 1926, and the other members of Quinn's syndicate didn't have nearly enough money between them to make up for the loss of Winslow's investment. Under the circumstances, the losses continued under the new ownership. Over an eight-year period from 1925 to 1932, the Red Sox averaged over 100 losses in a season. The team bottomed out in 1932 with a ghastly 43–111 record, 64 games out of first—still the worst record in franchise history. One of the few bright spots on these teams was Earl Webb, who set the all-time mark for most doubles in a season in 1931 with 67.

By the end of that season Quinn realized he didn't have nearly enough money to run the team in 1933. He had to borrow against his life insurance policy just to send the team to spring training. He searched for a buyer, and found one in lumber magnate Tom Yawkey, the nephew and adopted son of former Detroit Tigers owner Bill Yawkey. The younger Yawkey was about to gain full access to a trust fund set up for his uncle as soon as he turned 30, and wanted to use that money to buy a baseball team. Just days after Yawkey's 30th birthday, he bought the Red Sox from Quinn for $1.5 million.

Yawkey hired former A's and White Sox great Eddie Collins, a longtime friend, as general manager. Yawkey told Collins that he was to acquire as much talent as possible to get the Red Sox out of the American League basement. Among Collins' notable acquisitions were Lefty Grove, one of the greatest pitchers of all-time, Joe Cronin, who was one of the best hitting shortstops as well as manager, Jimmie Foxx, the slugging first baseman, and Wes Ferrell, an outstanding pitcher. Wes Ferrell's brother Rick Ferrell was an outstanding catcher whose .303 batting average is 12th on the all time Red Sox list. These moves paid off in 1934, when the Red Sox finished with their first .500 record since the 1918 World Series run, followed by their first winning record since then in 1935. The Red Sox would remain competitive for the remainder of the 1930s.

=== 1940–1949 ===
In 1939, the Red Sox purchased the contract of outfielder Ted Williams from the San Diego Padres of the Pacific Coast League, ushering in an era sometimes called the "Ted Sox". Williams is generally considered one of the greatest hitters of all time, because he consistently hit for both high power and high average. Stories of his ability to hold a bat in his hand and correctly estimate its weight down to the ounce have floated around baseball circles for decades. His book The Science of Hitting is widely read by students of baseball. He is also the last player to hit over .400 for a full season, hitting .406 in 1941. Williams feuded with sports writers his whole career, calling them "The Knights of the Keyboard", and his relationship with the fans was often rocky as he was seen spitting towards the stands on more than one occasion.

In 1946, with the help of a mid-season trade (Rudy York from Detroit), the Sox were able to win the 1946 Pennant (The first one in 28 years). Along with Williams, the Red Sox reached the 1946 World Series, but lost to the St. Louis Cardinals in seven games, in part because of the use of the "Williams Shift", in which the shortstop would move to the right side of the infield to make it harder for the left-handed-hitting Williams to hit to that side of the field. Some have claimed that Williams was too proud to hit to the other side of the field, not wanting to let the Cardinals take away his game. Williams did not fare well in the series, gathering only five singles in 25 at-bats, for a .200 average. However, his performance may have been affected by an elbow injury he had received a few days before when he was hit by a pitch in an exhibition game. Williams would never play in a World Series again. Williams served two stints in the United States Marine Corps as a pilot and saw active duty in both World War II and the Korean War, and missed at least five full seasons of baseball.

In the series however, Rudy York would hit game-winning home runs in games 1 and 3. Bobby Doerr would hit .409 with a 2-run homer in the game four loss. The loss to the Cardinals in game 7 of 1946 World Series is not without controversy as the Cardinals' Enos Slaughter scored the go ahead run all the way from first base on a base hit to left field. The throw from Leon Culberson was cut off by shortstop Johnny Pesky who relayed the ball to the plate just a hair too late. Some say Pesky hesitated or "held the ball" before he turned to throw the ball, but this has been disputed. OF Leon Culberson was in the game because Dom DiMaggio was injured while sliding into second base after his 2-run base hit that tied the game. Despite Leon Culberson's throwing blunder he did hit a home run in game five.

The right-field bullpens in Fenway Park were built in part for Williams' left-handed swing, and are sometimes called "Williamsburg". Before this addition to right field, it was over 400 feet (120 m) in that area of the ballpark. On June 9, 1946, Williams would hit the longest homer in Fenway Park at 502 feet (153 m), where a red seat still marks its landing spot.

The Red Sox featured several other players during the 1940s, including SS Johnny Pesky (for whom the right field foul pole in Fenway—"Pesky's Pole"—is affectionately named by fans, and in 2006 the Red Sox officially named it such), 2B Bobby Doerr, and CF Dom DiMaggio (brother of Joe DiMaggio).

The Red Sox narrowly lost the AL pennant in 1948 and 1949. In 1948, they finished in a tie with Cleveland, and their loss to Cleveland in a one-game playoff ended hopes of an all-Boston World Series. Curiously, manager Joe McCarthy chose journeyman Denny Galehouse to start the playoff game when the young lefty phenom Mel Parnell was available to pitch. In 1949, the Sox were one game ahead of the New York Yankees, with the only two games left for both teams being against each other, and they lost both of those games.

=== 1950–1959 ===
The 1950s were viewed as a time of tribulation for the Red Sox. After Williams returned from the Korean War in 1953, many of the best players from the late 1940s had retired or been traded. The stark contrast in the team led critics to call the Red Sox' daily lineup "Ted Williams and the Seven Dwarfs". Also, unlike many other teams, owner Tom Yawkey refused to sign players of African descent, even passing up chances at future Hall-of-Famers Jackie Robinson and Willie Mays, both of whom tried out for Boston and were highly praised by team scouts. Jackie Robinson was even worked out by the team at Fenway Park, however it appeared that owner Tom Yawkey did not want an African American player on his team at that time. Ted Williams hit .389 at the age of 38 in 1957, but there was little else for Boston fans to root for. Williams retired at the end of the 1960 season, famously hitting a home run in his final at-bat as memorialized in the John Updike story "Hub fans bid Kid adieu". The Sox finally became the last Major League team to field an African American player when they promoted infielder Pumpsie Green from their AAA farm team in 1959. Green made his debut at Fenway Park on August 4, where he played second base and was the leadoff hitter. With his first at-bat, Green hit a triple off of the Green Monster and then scored a run when Pete Runnels grounded out to first base. The 1950s had bright highlights like Pete Runnels .322 batting average in '58 and Jackie Jensen's 1958 MVP award.

== 1960s ==
=== 1960–1969: Resurgence to the Impossible Dream ===
The 1960s also started poorly for the Red Sox, though 1961 saw the debut of Carl "Yaz" Yastrzemski, (uniform #8) who developed into one of the better hitters of a pitching-rich decade. In 1967 the Red Sox also had slugging 1B George Scott, SS Rico Petrocelli (who would hit 40 home runs in the '69 season), rookie center fielder Reggie Smith and Cy Young Award winner Jim Lonborg.

Red Sox fans refer to 1967 as the year of the "Impossible Dream". The 1967 season is remembered as one of the great pennant races in baseball history because four teams were in the AL pennant race until almost the last game. The team had finished the 1966 season in ninth place, but they found new life with Yastrzemski as the team went to the 1967 World Series. Yastrzemski won the American League Triple Crown (the last player to accomplish such a feat until Miguel Cabrera in 2012) with a .326 average, 44 home runs and 121 RBI, and put forth what is considered one of the best seasons in baseball history. But the Red Sox lost the series—again to the St. Louis Cardinals, in seven games. Legendary pitcher Bob Gibson stymied the Sox, winning three games.

The season started with a Billy Rohr one-hitter at Yankee Stadium. In Detroit, Yastrzemski hit a game tying home run in the ninth, then Dalton Jones won it with a homer in the following inning. 1967 also saw the renewal of a rivalry with the Yankees. In a series at the Bronx, Boston third baseman Joe Foy hit a grand slam in the opener then the following night hit another homer. The Yankee pitching took revenge and started throwing the ball at Red Sox hitters. At Fenway one night against the Angels, rookie Reggie Smith hit 3 home runs in one night (which included hit from both sides of the plate). Newly acquired 2nd baseman Jerry Adair won it in extra innings with a home run into the Green Monster net in LF. The Red Sox won the final games against the Minnesota Twins at Fenway Park. In the first game 1B George Scott broke the tie with a home run to center field. Then Carl Yastrzemski won the AL home run contest by hitting his 44th into the bullpen. This broke a tie with the Twins' Harmon Killebrew. In the next game Jim Lonborg surprised everyone by bunting for a hit in the 5th inning. The BoSox scored 5 times that inning to take the lead. Twins pinch hitter Rich Collins popped to Rico Petrocelli to give the Red Sox their first pennant since 1946.

Also during the 1960s, a local Bostonian named Tony Conigliaro slugged 24 home runs as an 18-year-old rookie in 1964. On July 23, 1967, "Tony C." became the youngest player in the history of the American League to hit 100 home runs. However, tragedy would strike on August 18, when California Angels pitcher Jack Hamilton threw a high and inside fastball that struck Conigliaro on the left cheek just below the temple. Conigliaro collapsed to the ground with an imploded eyeball, and lay motionless on the ground before he was carried out on a stretcher. As a result of this injury Conigliaro missed the rest of the 1967 season, as well as the 1968 season with the exception of a limited participation in Spring Training.

The Red Sox went to the World Series to face the St. Louis Cardinals. In the opener at Fenway Park, Red Sox pitcher José Santiago hit a home run off legendary Bob Gibson. But they lost 2–1. In the following game Jim Lonborg pitched a no-hitter until the 8th inning when Julián Javier hit a leadoff double. Carl Yastrzemski hit two home runs in a 5–0 victory. The Series then shifted to St. Louis. In the third game Cardinal Nelson Briles pitched a 5–2 victory, Reggie Smith homered for the Sox. In game 4 Gibson shut out Boston 6–0 in a complete game victory. Down 3 games to 1 the Red Sox had Jim Lonborg to start game five. He pitched a 3-hitter and catcher Elston Howard hit a bloop single that gave them the win. In game six at Fenway Park, Manager Dick Williams started rookie pitcher Gary Waslewski to start it in an 8–4 victory. In the 4th inning Carl Yastrzemski, Reggie Smith and Rico Petrocelli hit home runs. Rico also homered in the 2nd inning. In game 7 Gibson won against Lonborg 7–2 to end the season.

== 1970s and 1980s ==
=== 1970–1979 ===
Soon after the Impossible Dream, the team began to wear a red hat with a navy blue B and a navy blue brim—sporting them for four seasons from 1975 to 1978—in contrast to the traditional navy hat with a red B.

Although the Red Sox played competitive baseball for much of the late 1960s and early 1970s, they never finished higher than second place in their division. The closest they came to a divisional title was 1972, when they lost by a half-game to the Detroit Tigers. The start of the season was delayed by a players' strike, and because games cancelled by the strike were not made up, the Red Sox were scheduled for one less game than the Tigers, and ended up losing the division title to the Tigers by a half-game. On October 2, 1972, they also lost the second to last game of the year to the Tigers, 4–1; in that game, Luis Aparicio fell rounding third (after Yastrzemski hit an apparent triple in the third inning) and tried to scamper back to third, but Yastrzemski was already on third. (As the lead runner, and not forced to advance, Aparicio was awarded the base, and Yastrzemski was out, his hit being reduced to a double.)

==== 1975 ====
The Red Sox won the AL pennant in 1975, with Yastrzemski surrounded by other players such as rookie outfielders Jim Rice and Fred Lynn the "Gold Dust Twins", veteran outfielder Dwight Evans "Dewey", catcher Carlton Fisk "Pudge", and pitchers Luis Tiant "El Tiante" and eccentric junkballer Bill Lee "The Spaceman". With many different personalities in the clubhouse, the 1975 Red Sox were as colorful as they were talented. Fred Lynn won both the American League Rookie of the Year award and the Most Valuable Player award, a feat which had never been accomplished at that time and was not duplicated until Ichiro Suzuki did it in 2001. Lynn would hit .331 with 21 home runs and Jim Rice would tally 22 homers and a .309 average. In the playoffs, the Red Sox swept the Oakland A's. Carl Yastrzemski returned to left field and had two assists. Yaz also helped the offense with a home run off Vida Blue in game two, Rico Petrocelli hit a game-winning home run off future hall of fame closer Rollie Fingers.

In the 1975 World Series, they faced the Cincinnati Reds, also known as The Big Red Machine, a team considered a baseball dynasty during the 1970s. Luis Tiant won games 1 and 4 of the World Series but after five games, the Red Sox trailed the series 3 games to 2. Game 6 played at Fenway Park is thought to be one of the greatest, if not the greatest, game in postseason history. The Sox struck first on a 1st inning Fred Lynn blast. But by the 8th they were down 6–3 in the bottom of the eighth when pinch hitter Bernie Carbo hit a three-run homer into the center field bleachers off Reds fireman Rawly Eastwick to tie the game. In the top of the eleventh inning, right fielder Dwight Evans made a spectacular catch of a Joe Morgan line drive and doubled Ken Griffey Sr. at 1st base to preserve the tie. The Red Sox ultimately prevailed in the bottom of the twelfth inning when Carlton Fisk hit a deep fly ball which sliced towards the left field foul pole above the Green Monster. As the ball sailed into the night, Fisk waved his arms frantically towards fair territory, seemingly pleading with the ball not to go foul. The ball hit approximately six inches to the fair side of the foul pole and bedlam ensued at Fenway as Fisk rounded the bases to win the game 7–6.

The Red Sox lost game 7 even though they had an early 3–0 lead on a RBI single by Carl Yastrzemski. Starting pitcher Bill Lee threw a slow looping curve which he called a "Leephus pitch" or "space ball" to Reds first baseman Tony Pérez who hit the ball over the Green Monster and across the street. The Reds scored the winning run in the 9th inning. Carlton Fisk said famously about the 1975 World Series, "We won that thing 3 games to 4."

==== 1976 ====
After the 1975 World Series, the Red Sox were in a financial dilemma. The Red Sox had to sign prospective free agents Lynn, Carlton Fisk, and Rick Burleson. The Red Sox were explaining that they could not afford Lynn, Burleson, and Fisk. To make matters worse, the Red Sox were about to buy Rollie Fingers and Joe Rudi from the Oakland A's. Many fans wondered how Boston could afford to sign Fingers and Rudi if they did not have the money to sign the three players that led them to the 1975 World Series. However, commissioner Bowie Kuhn stepped in and vetoed the deal, thus allowing Boston to re-sign Lynn, Fisk, and Burleson. Thanks to this distraction, the Red Sox won 83 games in 1976, finishing in third place.

==== 1977 ====
The 1977 season was a bounce-back with the hiring of Don Zimmer as manager and the signing of reliever Bill Campbell from the Minnesota Twins. They fought with the Baltimore Orioles for first place for much of the first half, even sporting seven All-Stars at the All-Star game at Yankee Stadium. However, the Yankees eclipsed them both after the All-Star game. The Orioles and Red Sox would finish tied for 2nd place with 97 victories apiece. Jim Rice, George Scott, Carl Yastrzemski, Carlton Fisk, Fred Lynn and Butch Hobson helped the Red Sox with 213 home runs.

==== 1978 ====
The 1978 season began with three more signings. The first brought in pitcher Dennis Eckersley from Cleveland. The other brought speedy second baseman Jerry Remy from the California Angels. The third stole Mike Torrez away from the hated Yankees. With these acquisitions, the Red Sox took off and fought with the Milwaukee Brewers for first place much of the first half. Just like the previous season, they sported seven All-Stars in the All-Star game at Jack Murphy Stadium. However, injuries to Fisk and Burleson would prevent the Sox to retain first place as the Yankees caught up to them.

In 1978, the Red Sox and the Yankees were involved in a tight pennant race. The Yankees were 14 1/2 games behind the Red Sox in July behind the hitting of MVP Jim Rice, Yaz, Carlton Fisk, Fred Lynn and George Scott, but on September 10, after completing a 4-game sweep of the Red Sox (known as "The Boston Massacre"), the Yankees tied for the divisional lead.

For the final three weeks of the season, the teams fought closely and the lead changed hands several times. By the final day of the season, the Yankees' magic number to win the division was one—which meant either a win over Cleveland or a Boston loss to Toronto would clinch the division for the Yankees. However, New York lost 9–2 and Boston won 5–0, forcing a one-game playoff to be held at Fenway Park on Monday, October 2.

The Red Sox took a 2–0 lead on a Yastrzemski homer and a run scoring single by Rice. Although Bucky Dent's three-run home run in the 7th inning off Mike Torrez just over the Green Monster—which gave the Yankees their first lead—is the most remembered moment from the game, it was Reggie Jackson's solo home run in the 8th that proved the difference in the Yankees' 5–4 win, which ended with Yastrzemski popping out to Graig Nettles with Rick Burleson representing the tying run at third. Although Dent became a Red Sox demon, the Red Sox would get retribution in 1990 when the Yankees fired Dent as their manager during a series at Fenway Park.

After the 1978 season, things would go bad for Boston as they let go of two clubhouse leaders. First, Luis Tiant would sign with the hated Yankees. Also, Bill Lee ended up on the upcoming Montreal Expos.

After the loss in 1978, John Cheever said to Diane White, "All literary men are Red Sox fans. To be a Yankee fan in literary society is to endanger your life". He also compared the Red Sox-Yankees rivalry to the Trojan War, with the Red Sox portraying the Trojans (broadbacked Carl Yastrzemski in a noble frieze, his poignant popup soaring beyond the topless towers of Troy before the dream is dashed by the grit-gloved Graig Nettles).

=== 1979–1989 ===
After the 1978 playoff game, the Red Sox did not reach the postseason for the next seven years. In 1979, Carl Yastrzemski would hit his 3000th career hit and Fred Lynn won the batting crown. The Sox would finish in third with a 91–69 record. Despite plus-.500 finishes in 1980 and 1981, the Red Sox decided not to resign Fred Lynn, Carlton Fisk, and Rick Burleson. Fisk would go to the White Sox, Lynn and Burleson went to the California Angels, in two separate trades that brought in Frank Tanana, Joe Rudi, Carney Lansford who would win the 1981 batting title, Rick Miller, and Mark Clear. The Red Sox would win 89 games in 1982 with 14 wins from reliever Mark Clear and a .349 batting average from rookie Wade Boggs. Carl Yastrzemski retired after the 1983 season, during which the Red Sox finished sixth in the seven-team AL East, posting their worst record since 1966.

However, in 1986, it appeared that the team's fortunes were about to change. The team's hitting and offense had remained strong with Jim Rice, Dwight Evans, Bill Buckner, Don Baylor, and future Hall of Famer Wade Boggs who would win 5 batting titles. Roger Clemens led the pitching staff, going 24–4 with a 2.48 ERA to win both the American League Cy Young and Most Valuable Player awards. Clemens became the first starting pitcher to win both awards since Vida Blue in 1971. This feat has been replicated twice since then (Justin Verlander in 2011, Clayton Kershaw in 2014).

The Red Sox won the AL East for the first time in 11 seasons, prompting a playoff series against the California Angels in the AL Championship Series. The teams split the first two games in Boston, but the Angels won the next two games at their home stadium, taking a 3–1 lead in the series. With the Angels poised to win the series, the Red Sox trailed 5–2 heading into the ninth inning of Game 5. A two-run homer by Baylor cut the lead to one. With two outs and a runner on, and one strike away from elimination, Dave Henderson homered off Donnie Moore to put Boston up 6–5. Although the Angels tied the game in the bottom of the ninth, the Red Sox won in the 11th on a Henderson sacrifice fly off Moore. The Red Sox then found themselves with six- and seven-run wins at Fenway Park in Games 6 and 7 to win the American League title.

==== 1986 World Series and Game Six ====
In the 1986 World Series the Red Sox played the New York Mets. Boston won the first two games in Shea Stadium but lost the next two at Fenway, knotting the series at 2 games apiece. After Bruce Hurst recorded his second victory of the series in Game 5, the Red Sox returned to Shea Stadium looking to garner their first championship in 68 years. However, Game 6 would go down as one of the most devastating losses in club history. After pitching seven strong innings, Clemens was lifted from the game with a 3–2 lead. Years later, Manager John McNamara said Clemens was suffering from a blister and asked to be taken out of the game, a claim Clemens denied. The Mets then scored a run off reliever Calvin Schiraldi to tie the score 3–3. The game went to extra innings, where the Red Sox took a 5–3 lead in the top of the 10th on a solo home run by Henderson, a double by Boggs and an RBI single by second baseman Marty Barrett. After recording two outs in the bottom of the 10th, the Red Sox were one strike away from breaking their championship drought. The champagne was on ice in the Red Sox clubhouse, a graphic appeared on the NBC telecast hailing Barrett as the World Series MVP, and a message even appeared briefly on the Shea Stadium scoreboard congratulating the Red Sox as world champions. After so many years of abject frustration, Red Sox fans around the world could taste victory. However, after three straight singles off Schiraldi and a wild pitch by Bob Stanley, the Mets tied the game at 5. It looked as though the Red Sox would record the third out leaving the score tied when Mookie Wilson hit a slow ground ball to first; the ball rolled through Bill Buckner's legs, allowing Ray Knight to score the winning run from second. While Buckner was singled out as responsible for the loss, many observers—as well as both Wilson and Buckner—have noted that even if Buckner had fielded the ball cleanly, Wilson possibly would still have been safe, leaving the game-winning run at third with two out. Many observers questioned why Buckner was in the game at that point considering he had bad knees and that Dave Stapleton had come in as a late-inning defensive replacement in prior series games. It appeared as though McNamara was trying to reward Buckner for his long and illustrious career by leaving him in the game. The Sox took a 3–0 lead on home runs by Dwight Evans and Rich Gedman but the Mets then won Game 7, concluding the devastating collapse and feeding the myth that the Red Sox were "cursed".

This World Series loss had a strange twist: Red Sox General Manager Lou Gorman was vice president, player personnel, of the Mets from 1980 to 1983. Working under Mets' GM Frank Cashen, with whom Gorman served with the Orioles, he helped lay the foundation for the Mets' championship.

The Red Sox returned to the postseason in 1988. With the club in fourth place midway through the 1988 season at the All-Star break, manager John McNamara was fired and replaced by Joe Morgan on July 15. Immediately the club won 12 games in a row, and 19 of 20 overall, to surge to the AL East title in what would be referred to as Morgan Magic. But the magic was short-lived, as the team was swept by the Oakland Athletics in the ALCS. Ironically, the MVP of that Series was former Red Sox pitcher and Baseball Hall of Fame player Dennis Eckersley, who saved all four wins for Oakland.

== 1990s ==
The 1990 season would provide a memorable end for Boston. The Red Sox held a 6 1/2-game lead in the American League East on September 2, but lost 15 of their next 21 games and surrendered the lead to the Toronto Blue Jays. However, the Red Sox managed to avoid a collapse by winning six of their final eight games to take back the American League East. The Red Sox again faced the Athletics in the ALCS. However, the outcome was the same, with the A's sweeping the ALCS in four straight. During the season, the Red Sox acquired reliever Larry Andersen via trade from the Houston Astros in order to bolster their bullpen. However, the player traded for Andersen turned out to be Boston native and future Hall of Famer Jeff Bagwell, who went on to play all 15 Major League seasons as a first baseman with the Astros.

That same year, Yankees fans started to chant "1918!" to taunt the Red Sox. The demeaning chant would echo at Yankee Stadium each time the Red Sox were there. Also, Fenway Park became the scene of Bucky Dent's worst moment as a manager, although it was where he had his greatest triumph. In June, when the Red Sox swept the Yankees during a four-game series at Fenway Park, the Yankees fired Dent as their manager. Red Sox fans felt retribution to Dent being fired on their field, while the Yankees used him as a scapegoat. However, Dan Shaughnessy of The Boston Globe severely criticized Yankees Owner George Steinbrenner for firing Dent—his 18th managerial change in as many years since becoming owner—in Boston and said he should "have waited until the Yankees got to Baltimore" to fire Dent. He said that "if Dent had been fired in Seattle or Milwaukee, this would have been just another event in an endless line of George's jettisons. But it happened in Boston and the nightly news had its hook." "The firing was only special because ... it's the first time a Yankee manager—who was also a Red Sox demon—was purged on the ancient Indian burial grounds of the Back Bay."

Tom Yawkey died in 1976, and his wife Jean Yawkey took control of the team until her death in 1992. Their initials are shown in two stripes on the Left field wall in Morse code. After Jean Yawkey's death, control of the team passed to the Yawkey Trust, led by John Harrington. The trust sold the team in 2002, concluding 70 years of Yawkey ownership.

In 1994, general manager Lou Gorman was replaced by Dan Duquette, a Massachusetts native who had worked for the Montreal Expos. Duquette revived the team's farm system, which during his tenure produced players such as Nomar Garciaparra, Carl Pavano, and David Eckstein. Duquette also spent money on free agents, notably an eight-year, $160 million deal for Manny Ramírez after the 2000 season.

Many fans were upset when Roger Clemens and Mo Vaughn left the team as free agents. After Clemens had turned 30 and then had four seasons, 1993–96, which were by his standards mediocre at best, Duquette said the pitcher was entering "the twilight of his career". Clemens went on to pitch well for another ten years and win four more Cy Young awards. In 1999, Duquette called Fenway Park "economically obsolete" and, along with Red Sox ownership, led a push for a new stadium. Despite support from the Massachusetts Legislature and other politicians, issues with buying out neighboring property and steadfast opposition within Boston's city council eventually doomed the project.

On the field, the Red Sox had some success during this period, but were unable to return to the World Series. In 1995, they won the newly realigned American League East, finishing seven games ahead of the Yankees. However, they were swept in three games in a series against the Cleveland Indians. Their postseason losing streak reached 13 straight games, dating back to the 1986 World Series. During the 1990s a group of young talented players joined the team such as infielders Nomar Garciaparra and John Valentin. Garciaparra would win the 1997 rookie of the year honor while hitting 60 home runs in his first two full seasons. John Valentin would make 1994 triple play while being one of the best AL hitters.

The 1996 season certainly had its individual highlights. Roger Clemens tied his major league record by fanning 20 Detroit Tigers on September 18 in what would prove to be one of his final appearances in a Red Sox uniform. Mo Vaughn had another All-Star season (.326 batting average, 44 home runs, 143 runs batted in) and newcomer Heathcliff Slocumb saved 31 games. However the Red Sox lost 19 of their first 25 games and finished third with an 85–77 record. They led the league in unearned runs. Even so, home attendance increased over 1995, to 2.3 million fans. Out of contention in 1997, the team traded closer Slocum to Seattle for catching prospect Jason Varitek and right-handed pitcher Derek Lowe.

In 1998, the Red Sox dealt pitchers Tony Armas Jr. and Carl Pavano to the Montreal Expos in exchange for pitcher Pedro Martínez. Martínez became the anchor of the team's pitching staff and turned in several outstanding seasons. In 1998, the team won the American League Wild Card, but again lost the American League Division Series to the Indians.

A year later, the 1999 Red Sox were finally able to overturn their fortunes against the Indians. Cleveland took a 2–0 series lead, but Boston won the next three games behind strong pitching by Derek Lowe, Pedro Martínez and his brother Ramón Martínez. Game 4's 23–7 win by the Red Sox was the highest-scoring playoff game in major league history. Game 5 began with the Indians taking a 5–2 lead after two innings, but Pedro Martínez, nursing a shoulder injury, came on in the fourth inning and pitched six innings without allowing a hit while the team's offense rallied for a 12–8 win behind two home runs and seven RBIs from outfielder Troy O'Leary. After the ALDS victory, the Red Sox lost the American League Championship Series to the Yankees, four games to one. The one bright spot was a lopsided win for the Sox in the much-hyped Martinez-Clemens game.

== 2000s: The World Series years ==
=== Early 2000s ===
In 2000, the Red Sox failed to take advantage of Nomar Garciaparra's career year and Pedro Martínez's historic season (18–6, 1.74 ERA, and his third Cy Young Award). Despite a few other standouts, they stumbled to an 85–77 clip. In 2001, though the Red Sox got an outstanding performance from new acquisition Manny Ramírez who would hit a home run in his first at bat at Fenway as a member of the Red Sox, the Red Sox struggled and, with a record of 65–53, fired manager Jimy Williams and replaced him with pitching coach Joe Kerrigan, under whom they went 17–26.

In 2002, the Red Sox were sold by Yawkey trustee and president Harrington to a consortium called New England Sports Ventures headed by principal owner John Henry. The group underbid the next highest bidder, James L. Dolan, in a complex deal arranged by consortium part-owner George Mitchell and MLB commissioner Bud Selig.

Tom Werner served as executive chairman, Larry Lucchino served as president and CEO, and serving as vice chairman was Les Otten. Within 24 hours, Dan Duquette was fired as general manager of the club on February 28, with former Angels general manager Mike Port taking the interim helm for the 2002 season. A week later manager Joe Kerrigan was fired and replaced by Grady Little.

While nearly all offseason moves were made under Dan Duquette, such as signing outfielder Johnny Damon away from the Oakland A's, the new ownership made additions after their purchase of the team, including trading for outfielder Cliff Floyd and relief pitcher Alan Embree. Nomar Garciaparra, Manny Ramírez, and Floyd (in limited time) all hit well, while Pedro Martínez put up his usual outstanding numbers. Derek Lowe, newly converted into a starter, won 20 games—becoming the first player to save 20 games in one season and win 20 games the following season. The Red Sox won 93 games but they finished 10 1/2 games behind the Yankees for the division and 6 behind the Angels for the wild card.

In the off season, Port was replaced by Yale graduate Theo Epstein after Oakland's Billy Beane turned down the position. At the age of 28, Epstein became the youngest general manager in the history of the Major Leagues up to that point. He was raised in Brookline.

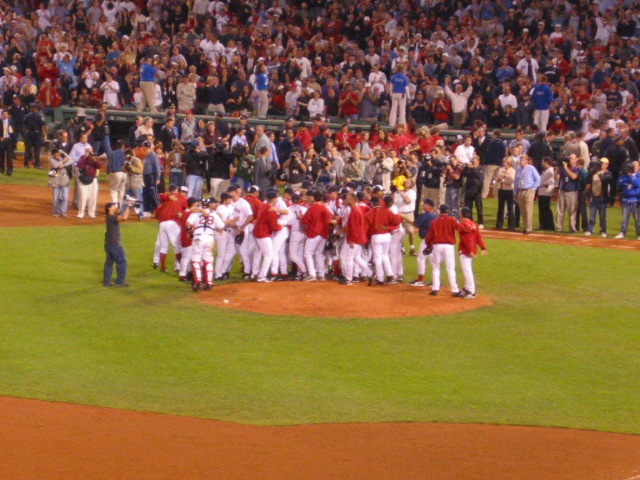
The Red Sox celebrate their clinching of the 2003 AL Wild Card with a victory over the Baltimore Orioles.

The "Idiots" of 2004 arose out of the "Cowboy Up" team of 2003, a nickname derived from first baseman Kevin Millar's challenge to his teammates to show more determination. In addition to Millar, the team's offense was so deep that eventual 2003 batting champion Bill Mueller was 7th in the lineup behind sluggers Manny Ramírez and the newly acquired David Ortiz.

Ortiz started the season as a platoon player with Mueller, Shea Hillenbrand, and Jeremy Giambi, with the four collectively playing first base, third base, and designated hitter. However, Hillenbrand became upset with his lack of playing time. General manager Theo Epstein, noting that Mueller was hitting very well in his limited role, traded Hillenbrand to the Arizona Diamondbacks for pitcher Byung-hyun Kim. Receiving much more playing time following the trade, Ortiz settled down and contributed significantly in the second half of the season. Epstein's decision ended up greatly benefiting the team, as the Red Sox broke many batting records and won the AL Wild Card on September 25 with a victory over the Baltimore Orioles at Fenway.

In the 2003 American League Division Series, the Red Sox rallied from a 0–2 series deficit against the Oakland Athletics to win the best-of-five series. In extra innings of game three at Fenway pinch hitter Trot Nixon belted a homer into the center field bleachers to give the Sox victory. Derek Lowe, who had become a starter after several years as a relief pitcher, returned to his former role to save Game 5, a 4–3 victory, by striking out the A's Terrence Long with the tying run on third base. The team then faced the New York Yankees in the 2003 American League Championship Series. In the deciding seventh game Boston took a 4–0 lead on home runs by Nixon and Kevin Millar. But two Giambi homers made it 4–2. Boston led 5–2 thanks to a shot by David Ortiz in the eighth inning, but Pedro Martínez, who was still pitching into the 8th inning, allowed three runs to tie the game, including a two-run bloop double by Jorge Posada. The Red Sox could not score off Mariano Rivera over the last three innings and eventually lost the game 6–5 when Yankee third baseman Aaron Boone hit a solo home run off Red Sox pitcher Tim Wakefield.

Some placed the blame for the loss on manager Grady Little for failing to remove Martínez in the 8th inning after some observers believe he began to show signs of tiring. Others credited Little with the team's successful season and dramatic come-from-behind victory in the ALDS. Nevertheless, Boston's management decided a change was in order. Little's contract expired after the season, and the organization decided not to exercise his option. He was replaced by former Philadelphia Phillies manager Terry Francona.

=== 2004 ===
During the 2003–04 offseason, the Red Sox acquired another ace pitcher, Curt Schilling, and a closer, Keith Foulke. Expectations once again ran high that 2004 would be the year that the Red Sox ended their championship drought. The regular season started well in April, but through mid-season the team struggled due to injuries, inconsistency and defensive woes.

Pitching remained strong from Pedro Martínez, Curt Schilling and Tim Wakefield. Offense was too much for the 2004 Red Sox led by Ortiz, Ramirez, Damon and Jason Varitek. But management shook up the team at the MLB trading deadline on July 31, when they traded the team's popular yet often injured shortstop, Nomar Garciaparra, to the Chicago Cubs, receiving Orlando Cabrera of the Montreal Expos and Doug Mientkiewicz of the Minnesota Twins in return. In a separate transaction, the Red Sox also traded minor leaguer Henri Stanley to the Los Angeles Dodgers for center fielder Dave Roberts. Many Red Sox fans initially blasted the trade as bringing the team inadequate compensation for Garciaparra. However, the club would turn things around soon after, winning 22 out of 25 games and qualifying for the playoffs as the AL Wild Card. Players and fans affectionately referred to the players as "The Idiots", a term coined by Johnny Damon and Kevin Millar during the playoff push to describe the team's eclectic roster and devil-may-care attitude toward their supposed curse.

==== 2004 ALDS and ALCS ====
Boston began the postseason by sweeping the AL West champion Anaheim Angels in the ALDS. However, Curt Schilling suffered a torn ankle tendon in Game 1 when he was hit by a line drive. The injury was exacerbated when Schilling fielded a ball rolling down the first base line. In the third game of the series, what looked to be a blowout turned out to be a nail-biter, as Vladimir Guerrero hit a grand slam off Mike Timlin in the 7th inning to tie the game. However, David Ortiz hit a walk-off two-run homer in the 10th inning to win the game. The Sox advanced to a rematch in the 2004 American League Championship Series against the New York Yankees.

The series started very poorly for the Red Sox. Schilling, pitching with an injured ankle, was routed for six runs in three innings. Yankees starter Mike Mussina had six perfect innings, and despite Boston's best efforts to come back, they ended up losing 10–7. In Game 2, with his Yankees leading 1–0 for most of the game, John Olerud hit a two-run home run to put New York up for good. Following this, the Red Sox were down three games to none after a crushing 19–8 loss in Game 3 at home. In that game, the two clubs set the record for most runs scored in a League Championship Series game. At that point in the history of baseball, no team had come back to win from a 3–0 series deficit. In Game 4, the Red Sox found themselves facing elimination, trailing 4–3 in the ninth with Yankees closer Mariano Rivera on the mound. After Rivera issued a walk to Kevin Millar, Dave Roberts came on to pinch run and promptly stole second base. He then scored on an RBI single by Bill Mueller which sent the game to extra innings. The Red Sox went on to win the game on a two-run home run by David Ortiz in the 12th inning. In Game 5, the Red Sox were again down late (by the score of 4–2) as a result of Derek Jeter's bases-clearing triple. But the Red Sox struck back in the eighth, as Ortiz hit a homer over the Green Monster to bring the Red Sox within a run. Then Jason Varitek hit a sacrifice fly to bring home Dave Roberts, scoring the tying run. The game would go for 14 innings, featuring many squandered opportunities on both sides. In the bottom of the 14th, Ortiz would again seal the win with an RBI single that brought home Damon. The 14-inning game set the record for the longest American League Championship Series game ever played.

With the series returning to Yankee Stadium for Game 6, the comeback continued with Schilling pitching on a bad ankle. The three sutures in Schilling's ankle bled throughout the game, making his sock appear bloody red. Schilling struck out four, walked none, and only allowed one run over seven innings to lead the team to victory. Mark Bellhorn also helped in the effort as he hit a three-run home run in the fourth inning. In the bottom of the ninth, the Yankees staged a rally and brought former Red Sox player Tony Clark to the plate as the potential winning run. Keith Foulke, pitching for the third day in a row, struck out Clark to end the game and force the deciding Game 7. In this game, the Red Sox completed their historic comeback owing to the strength of Derek Lowe's one-hit, one-run pitching and Johnny Damon's two home runs (including a grand slam in the second inning). The New York Yankees were defeated 10–3. Ortiz, who had the game-winning RBIs in Games 4 and 5, was named ALCS Most Valuable Player. The Red Sox joined the 1942 Toronto Maple Leafs and 1975 New York Islanders as the only professional sports teams in history to win a best-of-seven games series after being down three games to none, as would the 2010 Philadelphia Flyers and 2014 Los Angeles Kings.

==== 2004 World Series: Death of the Curse of the Bambino ====
The Red Sox faced the St. Louis Cardinals in the 2004 World Series. The Cardinals had posted the best record in MLB in 2004, and had previously defeated the Red Sox in the 1946 and 1967 World Series. The Red Sox began the series when Ortiz hit a 3-run homer to start the night. However Boston made many errors which allowed St. Louis to tie the game 9-all. But in the 8th inning the Red Sox won 11–9, marked by Mark Bellhorn's game-winning home run off Pesky's Pole. It was the highest scoring World Series opening game ever (breaking the previous record set in 1932). The Red Sox would go on to win Game 2 in Boston thanks to another great performance by the bloody-socked Curt Schilling. Boston scored all six runs with two-out RBI hits by Varitek, Orlando Cabrera and Varitek. In Game 3, Manny Ramirez got Boston started with a 1st-inning solo home run. Pedro Martínez (in his first World Series performance) shut out the Cardinals for seven innings and led Boston to a 4–1 victory. In Game 4, Damon led off the game with a home run and the Red Sox did not allow a single run, and the game ended as Édgar Rentería hit the ball back to closer Keith Foulke. After Foulke lobbed the ball to first baseman Doug Mientkiewicz, the Red Sox had won their first World Championship in 86 years. Boston held the Cardinals' offense to only three runs in the final three games and never trailed in the series. Fox commentator Joe Buck famously called the final play of the game with: "Back to Foulke. Red Sox fans have longed to hear it: The Boston Red Sox are World Champions!"

Manny Ramírez was named World Series MVP. To add a final, surreal touch to Boston's championship season, on the night of Game 4 a total lunar eclipse colored the moon red over Busch Stadium. The Red Sox won the title about 11 minutes before totality ended.

The Red Sox held a "rolling rally" for the team on Saturday, October 30, 2004. More than three million people filled the streets of Boston to celebrate as the team rode on the city's famous Duck Boats. The Red Sox earned many accolades from the sports media and throughout the nation for their season. In December, Sports Illustrated named the Boston Red Sox the 2004 Sportsmen of the Year.

With the New England Patriots winning Super Bowl XXXVIII in February, Boston became the first city since Pittsburgh in 1979 to have both Super Bowl and World Series champions in the same year. Their winning Super Bowl XXXIX during the offseason made Boston the first city since Pittsburgh in 1979–1980 to have two Super Bowl and World Series championships over a span of 12 months. After the Bruins won the 2011 Stanley Cup Finals, which made Boston the first city to win championships in all four sports leagues in the new millennium, Dan Shaughnessy of The Boston Globe ranked all seven championships by the Patriots, Red Sox in 2004 and 2007, the Celtics in 2008, and the Bruins and picked the Red Sox win in 2004 as the greatest Boston sports championship during the ten-year span.

=== 2005–2006 ===
After winning its first World Series in 86 years, Red Sox management was left with the challenge of dealing with a number of high-profile free agents. Pedro Martínez, Derek Lowe, and Orlando Cabrera were replaced with David Wells, Matt Clement, and Édgar Rentería, respectively. The club re-signed its catcher, Jason Varitek, and named him team captain. On April 11, the Red Sox opened their home season with a ring ceremony and the unveiling of their 2004 World Series Championship banner.

Pitchers Curt Schilling and Keith Foulke, key players in the previous year's playoff drive, spent large parts of the season on the disabled list. More of the team's struggles stemmed from the declining performances of some of its key role players: first baseman Kevin Millar (only 9 home runs), second baseman Mark Bellhorn (struck out once every 2.6 AB), and setup man Alan Embree (7.65 ERA). Without Foulke and Embree anchoring the pen, Theo Epstein took a chance on a number of journeymen who failed to bring stability. For much of the season Boston held first place in the AL East but down the stretch the team struggled, squandering its lead over the Yankees and allowing the Cleveland Indians to close the gap in the Wild Card race. The division crown would be decided on the last weekend of the season, with the Yankees coming to Fenway Park with a one-game lead in the standings. The Red Sox won two of the three games to finish the season with the same record as the Yankees, 95–67. However, a playoff was not needed. The Indians had a record of 93–69, thus qualifying both the Yankees and Red Sox for the playoffs. Since the Yankees had won the season series, 10–9, they won the division, whereas the Red Sox settled for the Wild Card. In the 2005 playoffs, the Red Sox faced the AL Central champion Chicago White Sox but were swept in three games.

On October 31, 2005, general manager Theo Epstein resigned on the last day of his contract, reportedly turning down a three-year, $4.5 million contract extension. On Thanksgiving evening, the Red Sox officially announced the acquisition of pitcher Josh Beckett from the Florida Marlins. Boston also added third baseman Mike Lowell and relief pitcher Guillermo Mota in the deal, while sending minor league prospects Hanley Ramírez, Aníbal Sánchez, Jesús Delgado, and Harvey García to the Marlins. On December 7, the Sox traded backup catcher Doug Mirabelli to the San Diego Padres for second baseman Mark Loretta (the team would later reacquire Mirabelli in May 2006). On December 8, the Sox gave up on Édgar Rentería, trading him and cash to the Atlanta Braves for third base prospect Andy Marte. On December 20, Johnny Damon declined arbitration and a few days later signed a four-year, $52 million deal with the New York Yankees. With Mike Lowell now on board, the Sox let Bill Mueller go via free agency to the Dodgers. Meanwhile, Kevin Millar was not offered arbitration and signed with the Baltimore Orioles.

On January 19, 2006, the Red Sox announced that Theo Epstein would be rejoining the Red Sox in a "full-time baseball operations capacity" and, five days later, he was renamed general manager. The Sox signed Bronson Arroyo to a three-year contract, but later traded him to the Reds for outfielder Wily Mo Peña. Veteran shortstop Álex González was signed to a one-year contract to replace Édgar Rentería. The team also filled the vacancy in center field left by Johnny Damon's departure by trading Mota, Marte, and prospect Kelly Shoppach to the Cleveland Indians for center fielder Coco Crisp, relief pitcher David Riske, and backup catcher Josh Bard. However, Crisp fractured his left index finger after playing only the first five games of the 2006 season. Crisp would miss over 50 games during the season and did not live up to expectations.

Third baseman Mike Lowell rediscovered his offense after a difficult season in Florida, and together with shortstop Álex González, second baseman Mark Loretta, and new first baseman Kevin Youkilis, the Red Sox had one of the best-fielding infields in Major League Baseball. On June 30, Boston set a major league record of 17 straight errorless games. This streak helped the Red Sox commit the fewest errors in the American League in 2006. During this span, they also recorded 12 consecutive victories, all in interleague play. The winning streak was the third longest in club history, behind only the 15 wins posted by the 1946 club and 13 victories in 1948. The Red Sox were well represented in the 2006 All-Star Game. David Ortiz and Mark Loretta started for the American League squad. Manny Ramírez, though elected to a starting role, did not appear due to a knee injury.

One of the brightest spots of the 2006 season was the emergence of new closer Jonathan Papelbon. The 25-year-old rookie fireballer was given the chance to save the April 5 game against the Texas Rangers. Two months later, he had saved 20 games in a row. On September 1, Papelbon left the game after experiencing shoulder pain. He would eventually be shut down for the rest of the season. Papelbon ended up setting a Red Sox rookie record with 35 saves while recording a minuscule 0.92 ERA and earning an All-Star appearance. Also, David Ortiz provided a late-season highlight by hitting 54 home runs, breaking the record of most home runs in a single season by a Red Sox player, previously set by Jimmie Foxx in 1938 with 50 home runs.

Down the stretch, the Red Sox wilted under the pressure of mounting injuries and poor performances. Boston would compile a 9–21 record in the month of August, with two six-game losing streaks included during that stretch. Despite Curt Schilling's resurgence in the starting rotation (15–7, 3.97 ERA), Josh Beckett had an inconsistent season, winning 16 games but allowing 36 homers and posting a 5.01 ERA. Injuries to Tim Wakefield, rookie Jon Lester (diagnosed with lymphoma), and Matt Clement left the rotation with major holes to fill. Injuries to Jason Varitek, Trot Nixon, Wily Mo Pena, and Manny Ramírez severely hurt the offense. On September 21, 2006, the Red Sox finished 2006 with an 86–76 record and third place in the AL East, their lowest placing in nine seasons.

=== 2007: Seventh World Series Championship ===
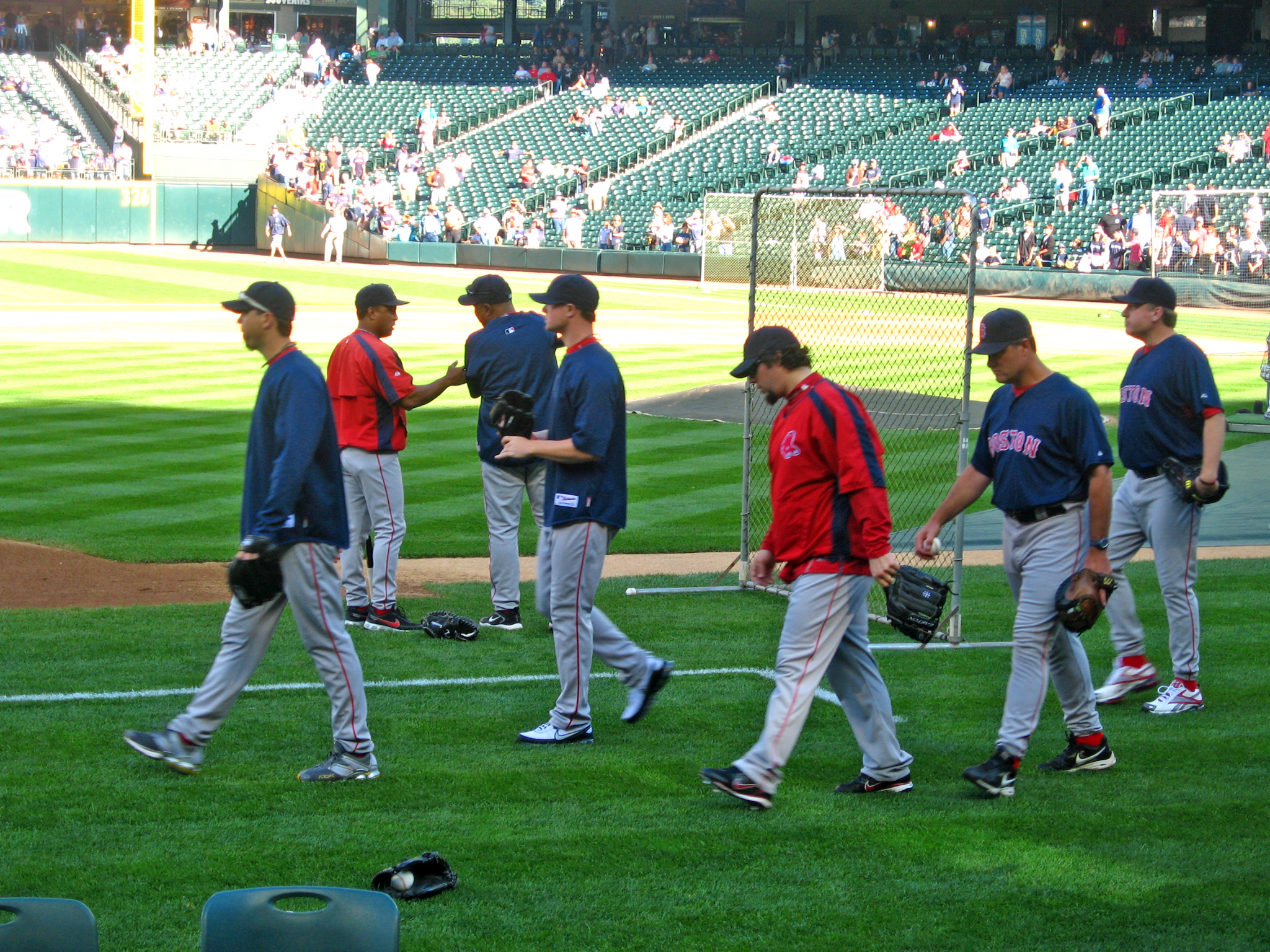
Pitchers (left – right) Josh Beckett, Jon Lester, Éric Gagné, pitching coach John Farrell and Curt Schilling, prior to a Red Sox game at Seattle during the weekend of August 3–5, 2007

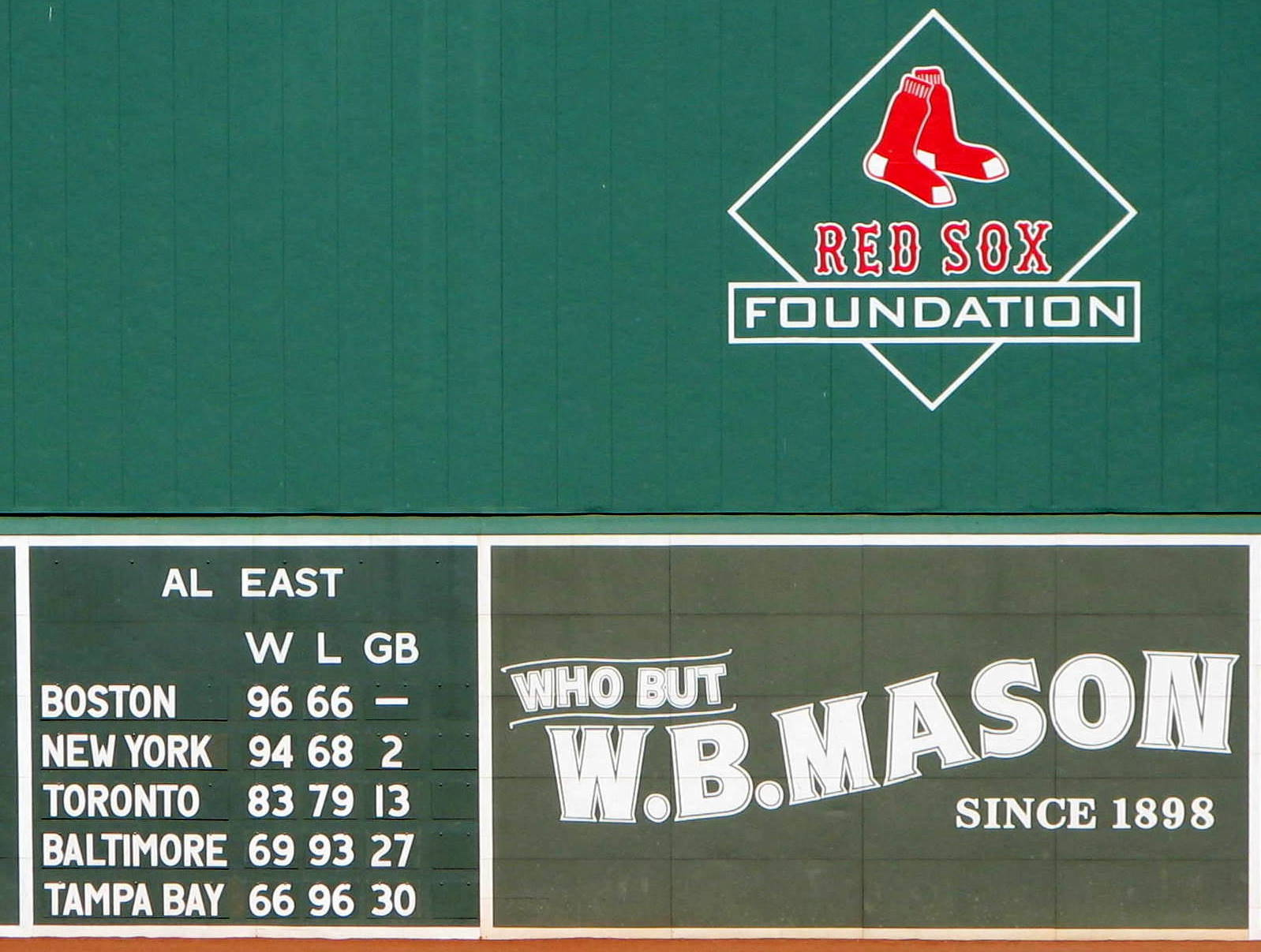
2007 AL East final standings

General Manager Theo Epstein's first major step toward restocking the team for 2007 was to pursue one of the most anticipated acquisitions in recent history. On November 14, Major League Baseball announced that the Red Sox had won the bid for the rights to negotiate a contract with Japanese superstar pitcher Daisuke Matsuzaka. Boston placed a bid of $51.1 million, and had 30 days to complete a deal. On December 13, just before the deadline, Matsuzaka signed a 6-year, $52 million contract.

In the hopes of solidifying the starting rotation, the team announced that closer Jonathan Papelbon would become a starter in 2007. With Papelbon becoming a starter and Keith Foulke leaving the team, the Red Sox began building up their bullpen in search of a new closer. J. C. Romero, Brendan Donnelly, Joel Piñeiro, and Japanese lefty Hideki Okajima all joined the Boston bullpen. However, no clear closer candidate emerged during Spring training. Eventually, Papelbon wanted to return to the closer role, and Red Sox officials believed Papelbon had rehabilitated himself so well in the offseason that his health of this shoulder was no longer a concern. The Red Sox had a star closer once again.

Shortstop Álex González was allowed to leave via free agency for the Cincinnati Reds. The Sox replaced him with Julio Lugo. Mark Loretta also was allowed to leave which opened up a spot for youngster Dustin Pedroia. Fan favorite Trot Nixon filed for free agency and agreed on a deal with the Cleveland Indians. With an opening in right field, the Red Sox pursued J. D. Drew, who had recently opted out of the remainder of his contract with the Los Angeles Dodgers to become a free agent. On January 25, 2007, the Red Sox and Drew agreed to a 5-year, $70 million contract. Another fan favorite, outfielder Gabe Kapler, announced his retirement at age 31 to fulfill his lifelong dream of becoming a manager. The Red Sox named him manager of their Class A affiliate, the Greenville Drive.

The Red Sox started quickly, moving into first place in the AL East by mid-April and never relinquishing their division lead. While Ortiz and Ramirez provided their usual offense, it was the hitting of Mike Lowell, Kevin Youkilis, and Dustin Pedroia that surprisingly anchored the club through the first few months. While Drew, Lugo, and Coco Crisp struggled to provide offense, Lowell and Youkilis more than made up for it with averages well above .300 and impressive home run and RBI totals. Pedroia started badly, hitting below .200 in April. Manager Terry Francona stuck with him and his patience paid off as Pedroia hit over .400 in May and finished the first half over .300. On the mound, Josh Beckett emerged as the ace of the staff, starting the year 9–0 and finishing 12–2 at the break. His success was needed as Schilling, Matsuzaka, Wakefield, and Tavarez provided consistent and occasionally good starts, but all struggled at times. The Boston bullpen, on the other hand, was there to pick up the starters often, anchored once again by Papelbon, a more experienced Manny Delcarmen, and Okajima. While Papelbon served as the stopper, the rise of Okajima as a legitimate setup man and occasional closer was a boon for the Sox, giving them more options late in the game. Okajima posted an ERA of 0.88 through the first half and was voted into the All-Star Game by the fans as the final selection. By the All-Star break, Boston had the best record in baseball and held their largest lead in the American League East, 10 games over intra-division rivals the Toronto Blue Jays and New York Yankees.

In the second half, more stars emerged for the Red Sox as they continued to lead the AL East division. Beckett continued to shine, reaching 20 wins for the first time in his career. At one point, veteran Tim Wakefield found himself atop the American League in wins, posting decisions in his first 26 starts, and finishing with a 17–12 record. However, as Wakefield, Matsuzaka, and Okajima became tired down the stretch, minor league call-up Clay Buchholz provided a spark on September 1 by pitching a no-hitter in his second career start. Another call-up, outfielder Jacoby Ellsbury, was thrust into the starting lineup while Manny Ramírez rested through most of September. Ellsbury played brilliantly during the month, hitting .361 with 3 HR, 17 RBI, and 8 stolen bases. Mike Lowell continued to carry the club, hitting cleanup in September and leading the team in RBI for the season, setting a team record for a third baseman with 120 runs driven in. And eventual 2007 Rookie of the Year Dustin Pedroia finished his outstanding first full season with 165 hits and a .317 average. The Red Sox became the first team to clinch a playoff spot for the 2007 season on September 22 with a come-from-behind defeat of the Tampa Bay Devil Rays. Boston captured their first AL East title since 1995 after a win on September 28 against the Minnesota Twins and a loss by the New York Yankees against the Baltimore Orioles.

In the playoffs, the Red Sox swept the Los Angeles Angels of Anaheim in the ALDS. Facing the Cleveland Indians in the ALCS, Josh Beckett won Game 1 but the Red Sox stumbled, losing the next three games. Facing a 3–1 deficit and a must-win situation, Beckett pitched eight innings while surrendering only one run and striking out 11 in a masterful Game 5 win. The Red Sox captured their 12th American League pennant by outscoring the Indians 30–5 over the final three games, winning the final two games at Fenway Park.

In the 2007 World Series, the Red Sox faced the Colorado Rockies. Beckett once again set the tone, pitching seven strong innings as the offense provided more than enough in a 13–1 victory. In Game 2, Schilling, Okajima, and Papelbon held the Rockies to one run again in a 2–1 game. Moving to Colorado, the Red Sox offense made the difference again in a 10–5 win. Finally, in Game 4, Jon Lester took Tim Wakefield's spot in the rotation and gave the Red Sox an impressive start, pitching 5 2/3 shutout innings. The Rockies threatened, but thanks to World Series MVP Mike Lowell and aided by a pinch-hit home run by outfielder Bobby Kielty, Papelbon registered another save as the Red Sox swept the Rockies in four games. The Red Sox captured their second title in four years.

=== 2008–2010 ===
The end of February 2008 sparked a controversy between Hank Steinbrenner and Red Sox Nation.

Red Sox Nation? What a bunch of bullshit that is ... That was a creation of the Red Sox and ESPN, which is filled with Red Sox fans ... Go anywhere in America and you won't see Red Sox hats and jackets, you'll see Yankee hats and jackets. This is a Yankee country. We're going to put the Yankees back on top and restore the universe to order.

— Hank Steinbrenner, March 2008

Due to Steinbrenner's comments, Red Sox owner John Henry inducted Hank Steinbrenner into Red Sox Nation, allowing him to receive perks such as a shirts, pins, Green Monster seats, and an autographed hat by David Ortiz.

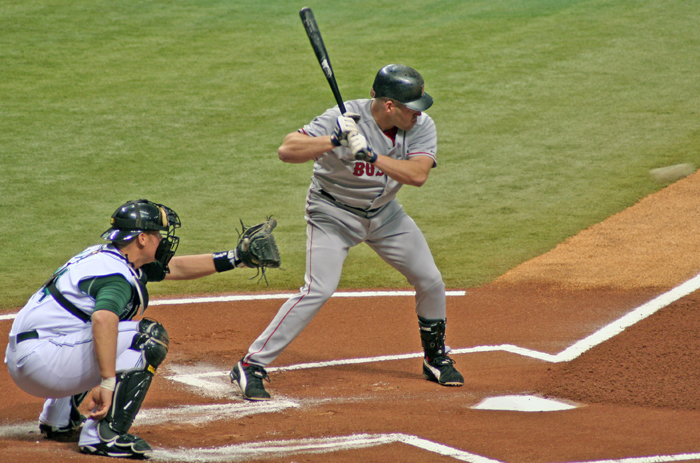
Kevin Youkilis

On the field, the Red Sox got off to a hot start in 2008, leading the American League Eastern Division for the first two months. In the process, Manny continued to be Manny by high-fiving a Red Sox fan in Baltimore while making a catch before turning and throwing to first base to double up a retreating runner. Later that month in the same place, Manny Ramirez hit his 500th career home run. Despite the positive progress, David Ortiz was injured on May 31. As a result, the usually quiet J. D. Drew stepped up by reinventing his image. He hit .337 with 27 RBI in June 2008. Another part of the Red Sox' reinvention occurred in an early June game against the Tampa Bay Rays where pitcher James Shields hit Coco Crisp, resulting in Crisp going straight to Shields. Shortly after, both benches cleared out in a brawl. In July, the defending champions sent seven All-Stars to the game at the hated Yankee Stadium, Dustin Pedroia, David Ortiz, J. D. Drew, Manny Ramirez, Jonathan Papelbon, Jason Varitek, and Kevin Youkilis, with Ramirez, Youkilis, and Pedroia named starters to Francona's American League squad. In the 2008 Major League Baseball All-Star Game at Yankee Stadium, J. D. Drew hit a two-run home run in the seventh inning. He earned All-Star Game MVP honors due to his stellar performance.

The Red Sox caught the Tampa Bay Rays during the summer as the Rays began to decline slightly. While the pennant race caught fire, Manny Ramirez did not want any part of it since the Red Sox did not offer him a sufficient contract for the 2009 season. As a result, Manny Ramirez went to the Los Angeles Dodgers in a three-way trade involving the Pittsburgh Pirates. The trade brought Jason Bay to the Red Sox. In September, the Rays held on to win the Eastern Division title with a 97–65 record. As for Boston, they won 95 games with a Wildcard berth. After defeating the Los Angeles Angels of Anaheim in the ALDS once again, they lost to the Rays in a seven-game ALCS.

After losing to the Tampa Bay Rays in the ALCS, the Red Sox debuted new road uniforms similar to their old 1986 road uniforms. The following offseason had the Red Sox sign Rocco Baldelli, John Smoltz, and Brad Penny. The Red Sox saw a postseason berth via the winning of the AL Wild Card, only to be swept away in the first round by the Los Angeles Angels of Anaheim.

On December 22, 2009, Sports Illustrated named general manager Theo Epstein as number 3 on its list of the Top 10 GMs/Executives of the Decade (in all sports).

Despite the additions of former Angels pitcher John Lackey, shortstop Marco Scutaro, third baseman Adrián Beltré and outfielder Mike Cameron, 2010 saw the Red Sox miss the playoffs for only the second time in the Terry Francona era, due largely to season-ending injuries to Kevin Youkilis, Dustin Pedroia and Jacoby Ellsbury. However, they did deny the defending World Series champion Yankees from clinching the AL East title, instead relegating them to the Wild Card on the final day of the regular season. The Red Sox began and ended their season playing the Yankees for the first time since 1950. After the season, third baseman Mike Lowell announced his retirement.

=== 2011–12: Epic collapse and fall to the bottom ===
After missing the playoffs in 2010, the Red Sox made a statement in the 2010–11 offseason, acquiring first baseman Adrián González, outfielder Carl Crawford, and relief pitchers Bobby Jenks, Andrew Miller, Matt Albers, and Dan Wheeler. However, the Red Sox lost their first 6 regular season games, and 10 of their first 12 games.

Although the Red Sox recovered from their early-season struggles, the pitching staff was plagued by injuries and underachievement throughout the year. Veteran starter John Lackey spent significant time on the disabled list, while also having one of the worst seasons by a Red Sox starting pitcher ever, posting a 6.41 ERA and 1.62 WHIP. Érik Bédard was obtained from the Seattle Mariners on July 31, but also had injury issues. Ace pitchers Jon Lester and Josh Beckett and rookie Kyle Weiland proved ineffective down the stretch as well.

Despite the injuries, the Red Sox led the Tampa Bay Rays by 9 games on September 3, when their odds of reaching the playoffs peaked at 99.6%. After September 3, the Red Sox lost 18 of 24 games for a 7–20 record in September. On the final day of the season, September 28, a blown save by Jonathan Papelbon in the 9th inning coupled with a come-from-behind Rays victory over the Yankees eliminated the Red Sox from playoff contention for the 2nd year in a row. They finished the season at 90–72.

After the season, manager Terry Francona and general manager Theo Epstein left the organization after controversial reports of starting pitchers Beckett, Lester, and Lackey drinking beer, eating fried chicken and playing video games in the Red Sox clubhouse during their off days, while their team was losing most of their September games.

The Red Sox did not improve the following season under manager Bobby Valentine, as they went 69–93 and finished last in the American League East for the first time since 1992. During the season, the Red Sox traded Beckett, Crawford, González and Nick Punto to the Los Angeles Dodgers in order to go under the luxury tax.

=== 2013: Eighth World Series Championship ===
Under new manager John Farrell, the Red Sox finished first in the American League East with a record of 97 wins and 65 losses. In the postseason, the Red Sox first defeated the AL wild card Tampa Bay Rays in the ALDS. In the ALCS, the Red Sox defeated the American League Central champion Detroit Tigers in six games. Advancing to the World Series, the Red Sox defeated the National League champion St. Louis Cardinals in six games to capture the franchise's eighth championship overall and third in ten years. The Red Sox became the second team to win the World Series the season after finishing last in their division; the first had been the 1991 Minnesota Twins. Amazing postseasons offensively from David Ortiz and Jacoby Ellsbury helped lead the way along with great pitching from Jon Lester, John Lackey and Jake Peavy.

=== 2014–2017: Falling back down and getting back up ===
The Red Sox fell back to earth in 2014, finishing last in the AL East with a 71–91 record. They became the first team in history to go from last place to first place to last place in three successive seasons. The Red Sox finished last again in 2015 with a 78–84 record; it was the first time since 1929 and 1930 that the team finished last in back-to-back seasons. However, the Red Sox immediately reverted back to their winning ways, winning back-to-back AL East crowns in 2016 and 2017, but were eliminated by the Cleveland Indians and Houston Astros in the ALDS respectively.

This period would see the emergence of a new core of Red Sox players in Mookie Betts, Jackie Bradley Jr., Xander Bogaerts, Christian Vázquez, Eduardo Rodríguez, Andrew Benintendi and Rafael Devers, all of whom were called up from the minor leagues. The Red Sox also added pitching help in future Cy Young Award winner Rick Porcello, former Cy Young winner David Price, Chris Sale, and closer Craig Kimbrel. However, they also made some free-agent blunders, such as bringing back former all-star infielder Hanley Ramírez and adding former World Series MVP Pablo Sandoval. Long-time designated hitter David Ortiz retired after the 2016 season.

=== 2018: Ninth World Series Championship ===
Under first year manager Alex Cora, the team finished with a 108–54 regular season record, winning the American League East division title for the third consecutive season, and finished eight games ahead of the second-place New York Yankees. The Red Sox were the first MLB team to post 100 wins during the season, reaching that milestone for the first time since 1946; they were also the first team to clinch a berth in the 2018 postseason. The team set a new franchise record for wins in a season by surpassing the prior mark of 105 that had been set in 1912; they also won the most games by any MLB team since the 2001 Seattle Mariners won 116.

The Red Sox entered the postseason as the top seed in the American League, and defeated the Yankees in four games in the Division Series. They then defeated the defending champion Houston Astros in five games in the Championship Series, advancing to the World Series where they defeated the Los Angeles Dodgers in five games.

Bob Melvin of the Oakland Athletics was named the AL Manager of the Year, while Cora was listed as runner-up. Mookie Betts was named the American League Most Valuable Player for 2018 as well as winning the batting title with a .346 average while adding 42 doubles, five triples, 32 homers, 129 runs, 80 RBIs and 30 stolen bases. Betts received 28 of a possible 30 first-place votes from the Baseball Writers' Association of America. The Red Sox also added J. D. Martinez and he put up a team-leading 43 home runs and a league-leading 130 RBI as the primary DH.

=== 2019–2023: The Chaim Bloom era and the years of mediocrity ===
After their World Series victory, the Red Sox went 84–78 in 2019 and missed the playoffs. Chaim Bloom was hired on October 2, 2019, to be the new president of baseball operations after the firing of Dave Dombrowski. On February 10, 2020, the Red Sox traded Mookie Betts to the Los Angeles Dodgers, who subsequently signed him to a 12-year extension. In the 2020 season, which was shortened to 60 games due to the COVID-19 pandemic, the Red Sox finished last in the AL East with a 24–36 record.

In 2021, the Red Sox clinched an AL wild card spot in a tight race with the New York Yankees, the Toronto Blue Jays and the Seattle Mariners. They defeated the Yankees in the AL Wild Card Game and faced the Tampa Bay Rays in the ALDS. The Red Sox won three games to one, walking off in the final two games. In the ALCS, the Red Sox would be eliminated by the Houston Astros in six games.

In 2022, the Red Sox fell back into the cellar of the AL East with a 78–84 record. The offseason saw the departure of shorstop Xander Bogaerts, who signed an 11-year contract with the San Diego Padres, and designated hitter J. D. Martinez, who joined the Los Angeles Dodgers.

On September 4, 2023, the Red Sox fired Chaim Bloom, ending his tenure. The Red Sox ended the season with a 78–84 record and last place in the AL East for the second straight year.

=== 2024–present: The Craig Breslow era and more years of mediocrity ===
The 2024 season saw minimal improvement in the Red Sox, who finished third in the AL East with an 81–81 record. This was the team's first season with Craig Breslow in charge of baseball operations. In one of Breslow's first moves, he traded Chris Sale to the Atlanta Braves, who went on to win the pitching triple crown and the Cy Young Award. The Red Sox then signed free agents Lucas Giolito and Liam Hendriks from the Chicago White Sox, but both players missed the entire season due to injuries. This season saw Jarren Duran emerge as an all-star, carrying the team with a .285 average, 21 home runs and a league-leading 48 doubles and 14 triples. Tyler O'Neill, in his lone season with the Red Sox, clubbed 31 home runs, and Rafael Devers would put up 28 home runs and 83 runs batted in. Pitching-wise, Tanner Houck enjoyed his best season, pitching to a 3.12 ERA despite a 9–10 record, and opening day starter Brayan Bello won 14 games despite a 4.49 ERA. The 2024 Red Sox were a subject of a Netflix documentary titled "The Clubhouse: A Year with the Red Sox".

The 2025 season saw the Red Sox return to postseason play, finishing with an 89–73 record before losing in three games to the New York Yankees in the AL Wild Card Series. Prior to the season, the Red Sox acquired Garrett Crochet from the Chicago White Sox and immediately inserted him as the opening day starter. Crochet responded with a career-best 2.59 ERA, 255 strikeouts and 18 wins, finishing second in AL Cy Young voting behind Tarik Skubal of the Detroit Tigers. The Red Sox also signed Aroldis Chapman, who enjoyed his finest season with a career-low 1.17 ERA and 32 saves, winning the AL Reliever of the Year Award. At the plate, the Red Sox signed Alex Bregman from the Houston Astros, immediately placing him as their third baseman. This forced Devers to become an everyday designated hitter, but midway through the season, they traded Devers to the San Francisco Giants. Nevertheless, young prospects Roman Anthony and Carlos Narváez showed promise for the Red Sox offense, while Trevor Story rebounded from three consecutive injury-riddled seasons to club 25 home runs and 96 RBI.

== See also ==
The Sports Museum (in TD Garden)
