= Tsuneko Gauntlett =

Japanese activist (1873–1953)

- ガントレット恒
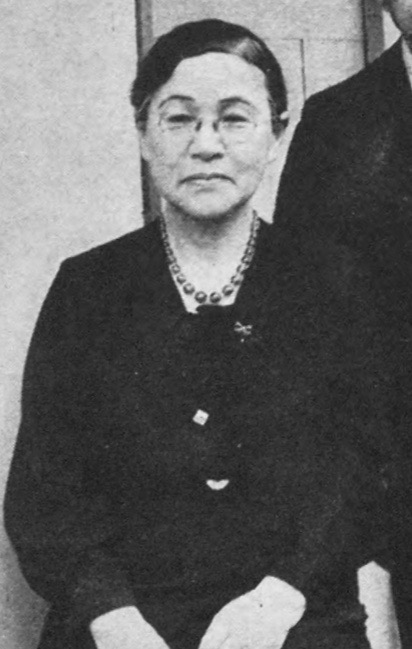
- Born: Yamada Tsune; October 26, 1873; Anjō, Aichi, Japan
- Died: November 29, 1953 (aged 80); Tokyo, Japan
- Other names: Tsune Gauntlett; C. T. Gauntlett
- Citizenship: Japan; United Kingdom (1898 to 1941)
- Spouse: George Edward Luckman Gauntlett (m. 1898)
- Children: 6
- Relatives: Kosaku Yamada (brother)

Tsuneko Yamada Gauntlett (ガントレット恒, October 26, 1873 – November 29, 1953), born Yamada Tsune, was a Japanese temperance, suffrage, and peace activist. In 1937 she was international president of the Pan-Pacific Women's Association.

== Early life ==
Yamada Tsune was born in what is now part of the city of Anjō, Aichi, the daughter of a samurai, Yamada Kenzō. Her younger brother was composer Kosaku Yamada. She was educated at the Sakurai Girls' School, where one of her teachers was Yajima Kajiko.

== Career ==
Tsuneko Gauntlett taught at the Kyōai Girls' School in Maebashi as a young woman. She also worked as a translator. She was active with the Women's Christian Temperance Union (WCTU) in Japan from the early 1890s. She attended the international meeting of the WCTU in London in 1920. She served as the organization's president in Japan after World War II.

Gauntlett was also a leader in the Japan Woman's Suffrage Association, with Kubushiro Ochimi. She was vice-chair of the Japanese delegation to the first Pan-Pacific Women's Congress in Hawaii in 1928, and spoke on work against human trafficking. She and Utako Hayashi presented a peace petition to British prime minister Ramsay MacDonald at the London Naval Conference in 1930, and she spoke about her London experiences in San Francisco later that year.

Gauntlett returned to Hawaii for another Pan-Pacific Women's Congress in 1935. She was elected president of the Pan-Pacific Women's Association, succeeding Australian biologist Georgina Sweet, and presided when the organization met in 1937, in Vancouver. In 1939, she was vice-president of the Pan-Pacific Women's Association, and head of the Japanese Federation of Women's Organizations.

Gauntlett wrote short biographies of Japanese women leaders, including "Madam Kajiko Yajima: A Brief Sketch of Her Life" (1934) "Miss Uta Hayashi, a brief sketch of her life" (1934), and "Dr. Yayoi Yoshioka: A Brief Sketch of Her Life" (1934).

== Marriage, citizenship, and children ==
Yamada Tsune married British educator George Edward Luckman Gauntlett in 1898. Their interracial wedding required a letter from Queen Victoria. Because of the marriage, Tsuneko Gauntlett became a British citizen, until 1941 when both Gauntletts became Japanese citizens, using the family name "Ganto" as an approximation of "Gauntlett". The Gauntletts had six children together; two of their daughters (Frances and Kathleen) remained British citizens and lived in Canada and England during World War II; two of their children (Winifred and Owen) married Japanese people and lived in Japan during the war; their daughter Amy lived in Japan with her South African husband, and their youngest son Trevor became a Japanese citizen in 1941.

== Death ==
Tsuneko Gauntlett died in 1953, aged 80 years, at her home in Shinjuku, Tokyo. "Mrs. Gauntlett devoted most of her life to the betterment of Japanese women's status," summarized one American newspaper obituary. Her grave is with her husband's, in Tama Cemetery in Tokyo.
