= Choreographic Symphony "Maria Magdalena" =

1918 orchestral composition by Kōsaku Yamada

- by Kōsaku Yamada
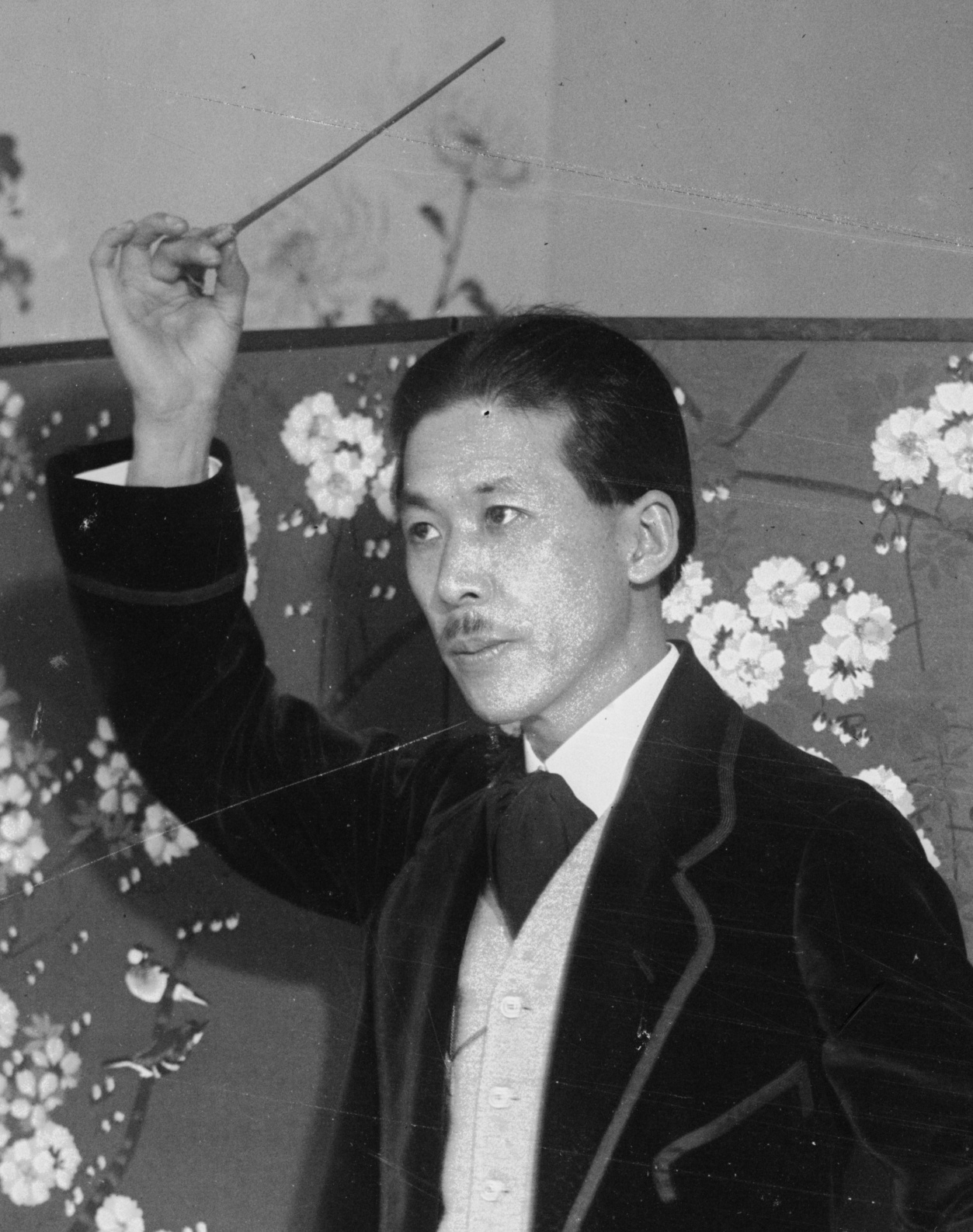
- Yamada, c. 1915–20
- Native name: 舞踊交響曲《マグダラのマリア》
- Key: D major
- Style: Post-romanticism
- Composed: 1916–1918
- Publisher: Daiichi Hoki Publishing
- Duration: 15–18 minutes
- Movements: 1

Premiere
- Date: 16 October 1918
- Location: Carnegie Hall, New York
- Conductor: Kosaku Yamada

The Choreographic Symphony "Maria Magdalena" (Note: 舞踊交響曲《マグダラのマリア》, Buyō Kōkyōkyoku "Magudara no Maria") is an orchestral composition written by the Japanese composer Kōsaku Yamada in 1916–1918. It is based on the second act of an unfinished ballet sketched by Yamada in 1916, which was in turn based on Maurice Maeterlinck's 1910 play Marie-Magdeleine. The second act (Joseph's House in Arimathaea) was orchestrated as an independent piece during the composer's stay in the United States between 1917 and 1919. The piece was premiered in Carnegie Hall on 16 October 1918, conducted by the composer. With D major as the main key, the piece focuses on the struggles of the titular character Mary Magdalene, with the triumph of her faith in the end. It had to be reconstructed multiple times afterwards due to the loss of the manuscript.

== Background ==
In 1910, and thanks to the patronage of Japanese industrialist Koyata Iwasaki, Yamada moved to Germany where he enrolled in the Prussian Academy of Arts and studied composition under Max Bruch and Karl Leopold Wolf. There he was the first Japanese composer to write orchestral music in genres such as the overture, symphony and symphonic poem, as well as the first to compose an opera. Due to the lack of performance opportunities in Germany, Yamada returned to Japan in 1913, hoping to return soon to Europe and permanently establish himself there. The outbreak of World War I changed his plans, and from then on he dedicated himself to support Japanese classical music.

During his studies in Berlin, Yamada adopted a Germanic, conservative romantic style closely indebted to composers like Beethoven, Mendelssohn, Schumann, Brahms, and Schubert. This is reflected in composition exercises such as the Overture in D major and Symphony in F major, both from 1912. Yamada soon abandoned this style however, and by 1913 he had taken Wagner and post-Wagnerian composers as models. Compositions such as the symphonic poems "The Dark Gate" and "Flower of Mandala", both from 1913, display the influences of Claude Debussy, Alexander Scriabin and most notably, Richard Strauss. According to music critic Morihide Katayama, Yamada integrated German late Romanticism, French Impressionism, Scriabin's mystic language and the Japanese tradition in this work.

Also during his Berlin studies, Yamada took a great interest in ballet, such as those from the Ballets Russes. He even took dancing classes at the Jacques-Dalcroze's dance school in Dresden. His fondness for ballet remained after returning to Japan, and while he did not complete a full ballet, his operas "Ayame" (1931) and "Dawn" (1941) both feature substantial balletic scenes.

== Composition ==
In 1916, Yamada conceived a ballet based on Maurice Maeterlinck's 1910 tragic play Marie-Magdeleine, approximately 30 minutes in duration and large-scale in scope. It was part of a bigger project, a dramatic dance stage production called "Poetic Dance", in collaboration with Japanese dancer and choreographer Baku Ishii and Kaoru Oyamauchi. He completed two acts in piano sketches (The Sermon on the Mount and Joseph's House in Arimathaea). The project came to nothing, and due to the lack of performing prospects for such a work at the time, Yamada left the piece unfinished. Later on and according to the composer, "Maria Magdalena" could not be properly set as a ballet due to religious concerns, as Jesus Christ appears in the play.

During Yamada's stay in the United States between 1917 and 1919, Yamada orchestrated the sketches of the second act in New York as a Choreographic Symphony. It was premiered in Carnegie Hall on 16 October 1918, conducted by Yamada himself, with a second performance taking place on 24 January 1919. (Note: Morihide Katayama wrongfully claims it was premiered on 24 January 1919) A review found in the Evening Post dated 17 October 1918 described the concert as "disappointing", remarking the composer's imitation of the western style when audiences were expecting something more exotic that evoked "the land of Madame Crysantheme". Quoted below are some concrete remarks about the piece from the same review.

In this symphony, "Mary Magdalene", he (Yamada) showed that he and Strauss were well acquainted [...] He seems to be several different people at once — Schubert and Debussy and even Stravinsky — all inside the walls of one symphonic poem."

=== Description ===
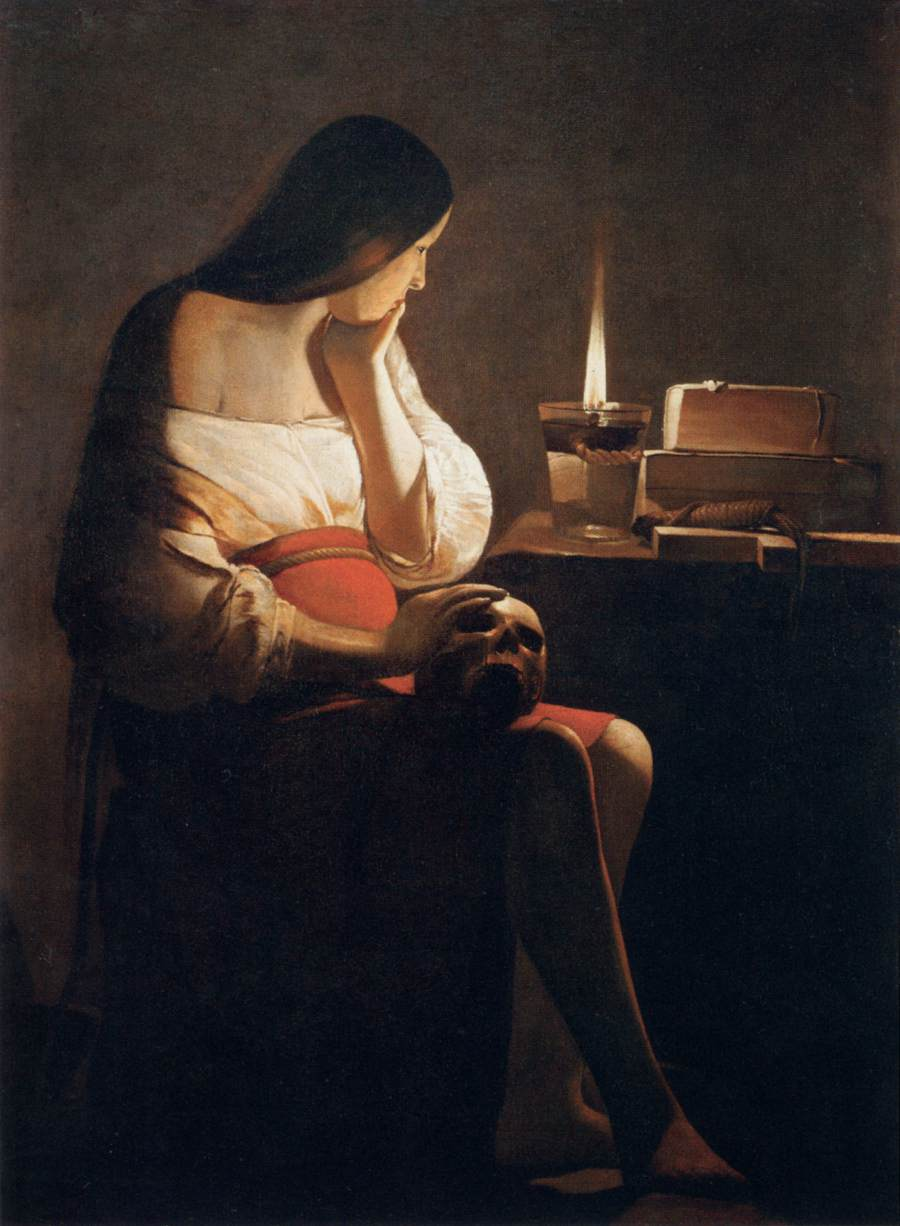
Magdalene with the Smoking Flame (c. 1640–1645) by Georges de La Tour

External audio
- Performed by the Tokyo Philharmonic Orchestra under Takuo Yuasa
- Choreographic Symphony "Maria Magdalena"

The plot of Act II of the ballet goes as follows:

On the night Jesus Christ was captured, his flock, including Mary Magdalene, assemble at Joseph's house in Arimathaea. They feel uneasy, confused and restless. Then a Roman officer comes up. He is in love with Mary and urges her to accept his love, if she wishes to save Jesus. In anguish, Mary eventually turns down his proposal. The officer begins to threaten her by force, when the procession of the captured Jesus passes by the window. The procession is lit by torches and looks as if it were wrapped in an aura of divinity. Mary continues to reject the officer and tells him to leave. The officer goes, as if persuaded by the nobility of Jesus and Mary. Mary's image shines in the light.

The score of the symphony contains neither plot notes nor programmatic explanations, but according to Katayama, the music and plot support each other. The key of the work is centered around D major, with the Mary Magdalene's faith as the main focus while other motives threaten it. Of these the most prevalent is Beethoven's famous "fate motive" from his Symphony No. 5 in C minor, as well as a descending chromatic figure introduced by woodwinds right in the opening of the piece. The music is largely based on this alternating dynamic of stability and instability until Magdalene's faith finally triumphs at the end.

=== Post-premiere history ===
The piano sketches the work was based on were eventually lost, and the manuscript of the choreographic symphony was also lost early on. It may have been reconstructed from surviving parts for a performance by the Berlin Philharmonic Orchestra in 1937, but this restoration was also lost. The piece was published in a third reconstruction realised by Daiichi Hoki Publishing, but the score was full of mistakes, especially with the omission of an entire percussion section. A new edition by Craftone Editions fixed these issues. The piece was then revived in 2004 for a concert of the Japan Opera Association, performed by the Tokyo City Philharmonic Orchestra conducted by Yazaki Hikotaro. Then in 2005 the piece was recorded for the label Naxos Records, with the Tokyo Metropolitan Symphony Orchestra conducted by Takuo Yuasa.

== Instrumentation ==
The work is scored for a larger orchestra when compared to previous works by the composer.

Woodwinds

3 flutes (third doubling piccolo)
3 oboes
cor anglais
2 clarinets in A (one doubling B♭)
bass clarinet
3 bassoons
contrabassoon

Brass

4 French horns in F
4 trumpets in A (one doubling B♭)
3 trombones
tuba

Percussion

timpani

bass drum
snare drum
cymbal
tam-tam
triangle
tambourine

Strings

2 harps

violins I
violins II
violas
violoncellos
double basses

== Assessment ==
Assessment on the work is varied. Morihide Katayama remarks the influences of Wagner and Strauss, concluding with the following praise.

The music is restless, hectic, rich in dynamics and timbres, and silence and pauses are effectively used. This elusive quality reflects Japanese aesthetic sense, where ephemerality and subtle changes of moments are preferred to logical construction.

David Denton, in a review found in David's Review Corner, described the work with the following statement.

There is Scriabin, Rimsky-Korsakov and Strauss here in rather equal measures, and if derivative, Yamada was so skilled in orchestration as to arrive at a highly attractive product.

Dan Morgan in MusicWeb International is more critical towards the piece. Leaving the following summary.

It's scored for a large orchestra and has some intermittently noble writing for brass. There is even some tenderness - voiced by the harps - but the dreary, sub-Straussian harmonies not to mention the hyperactive bass drum and gongs are too close to banality for comfort.

On the other hand, Derek Warby (also in the same medium) praised the piece with the following description.

This colourful score shows the influences of Strauss and Wagner (at 6:46 and 13:04) very strongly and contains some strikingly lyrical Straussian writing (eg 2:53). And is that a snatch of Mahler's First Symphony at 9:21? The music is less derivative than perhaps I have made it appear [..]. Given its first performance in Carnegie Hall, New York City in 1918, this is a very attractive symphonic poem which will give much pleasure.

== Recordings ==
Conductor	Orchestra	Recording date	Formats	Labels	Catalogue ID	References
Kazuo Yamada	Tokyo Metropolitan Symphony Orchestra	1983, released 1984	LP / CD / Digital	Victor Records	SJX-1170 / VDC-5501	
Takuo Yuasa	Tokyo Metropolitan Symphony Orchestra	2005, released 2007	CD / Digital	Naxos Records	NAXOS 8.557971	
