= Flower of Mandala =

1913 composition by Kōsaku Yamada

- by Kōsaku Yamada
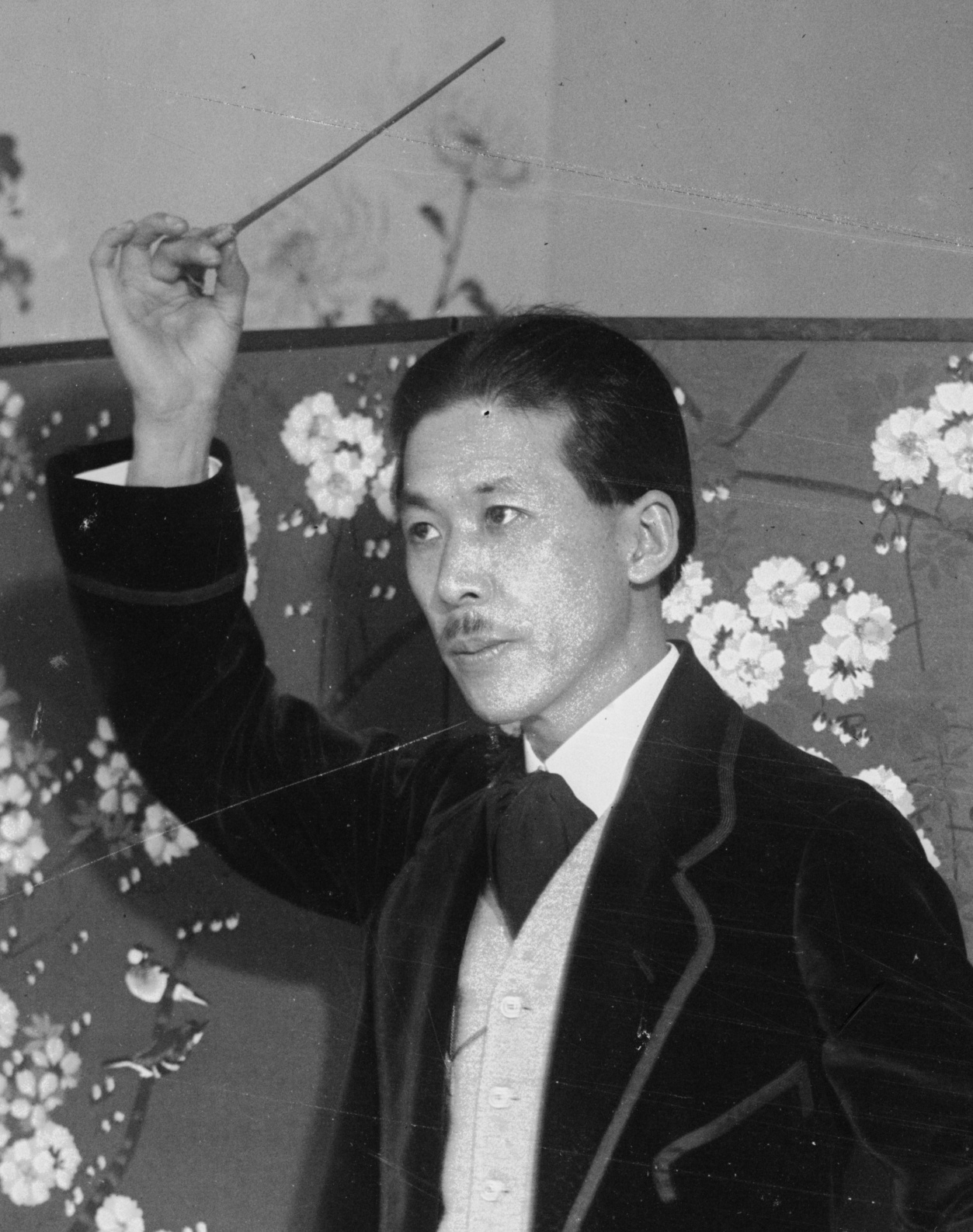
- Yamada c. 1915–20
- Native name: 曼陀羅の華
- Genre: Symphonic poem
- Style: Post-romanticism
- Composed: 1913
- Published: 2016
- Publisher: Craftone Edition
- Duration: 7 minutes
- Movements: 1

Premiere
- Date: 6 December 1914
- Location: Imperial Theatre, Tokyo
- Conductor: Kōsaku Yamada
- Performers: Tokyo Philharmonic Society

Flower of Mandala (曼陀羅の華, Madara No Hana) (also referred as Flower of Madara) is a symphonic poem composed in 1913 by Japanese composer Kōsaku Yamada, based on a poem by the same title by Japanese artist Kazo Saito. According to Morihide Katayama, the title refers to "beautiful flowers growing in Buddhist heaven". It was premiered at the Imperial Theatre in Tokyo on 6 December 1914, performed by the Tokyo Philharmonic Society conducted by the composer. The piece represents a kind of synthesis between Eastern and Western cultures, Yamada employing the Western orchestra and form as a medium to express Japanese artistic concepts. Flower of Mandala has been praised by multiple music critics and reviewers.

== Background ==
In 1910, and thanks to the patronage of Japanese industrialist Koyata Iwasaki, Yamada moved to Germany where he enrolled in the Prussian Academy of Arts and studied composition under Max Bruch and Karl Leopold Wolf. There he was the first Japanese composer to write orchestral music in genres such as the overture, symphony and symphonic poem, as well as the first to compose an opera. Due to the lack of performance opportunities in Germany, Yamada returned to Japan in 1913, hoping to return soon to Europe and permanently establish himself there. The outbreak of World War I changed his plans, and from then on he dedicated himself to support Japanese classical music.

During his studies in Berlin, Yamada adopted a Germanic, conservative romantic style closely indebted to composers like Beethoven, Mendelssohn, Schumann, Brahms, and Schubert. This is reflected in composition exercises such as the Overture in D major and Symphony in F major, both from 1912. Yamada soon abandoned this style however, and by 1913 he had taken Wagner and post-Wagnerian composers as models. Compositions such as the symphonic poems "The Dark Gate" and "Flower of Mandala", both from 1913, display the influences of Claude Debussy, Alexander Scriabin and most notably, Richard Strauss. The aforementioned works also represent a kind of synthesis between Eastern and Western cultures, Yamada employing the Western orchestra and form as a medium to express Japanese artistic concepts.

== Composition ==
The piece was written between July and November 1913, alongside the earlier "The Dark Gate". It was inspired by a poem with the same title by Japanese polyfacetic artist Kazo Saito, who was a painter, architect, composer, clothes and furniture designer. Saito and Yamada met during their respective stay in Berlin and became close friends. The piece was also inspired by Strauss's symphonic poem Death and Transfiguration.

It was premiered shortly after the composer's return to Japan alongside the Symphony in F major "Triumph and Peace", played at the Imperial Theatre in Tokyo on 6 December 1914, performed by the Tokyo Philharmonic Society conducted by the composer. Its next performance was in Carnegie Hall, New York, on 16 October 1918. It was part of a concert dedicated purely to the orchestral music of the Japanese composer. The score was published in 2016 by Craftone Edition.

== Description ==
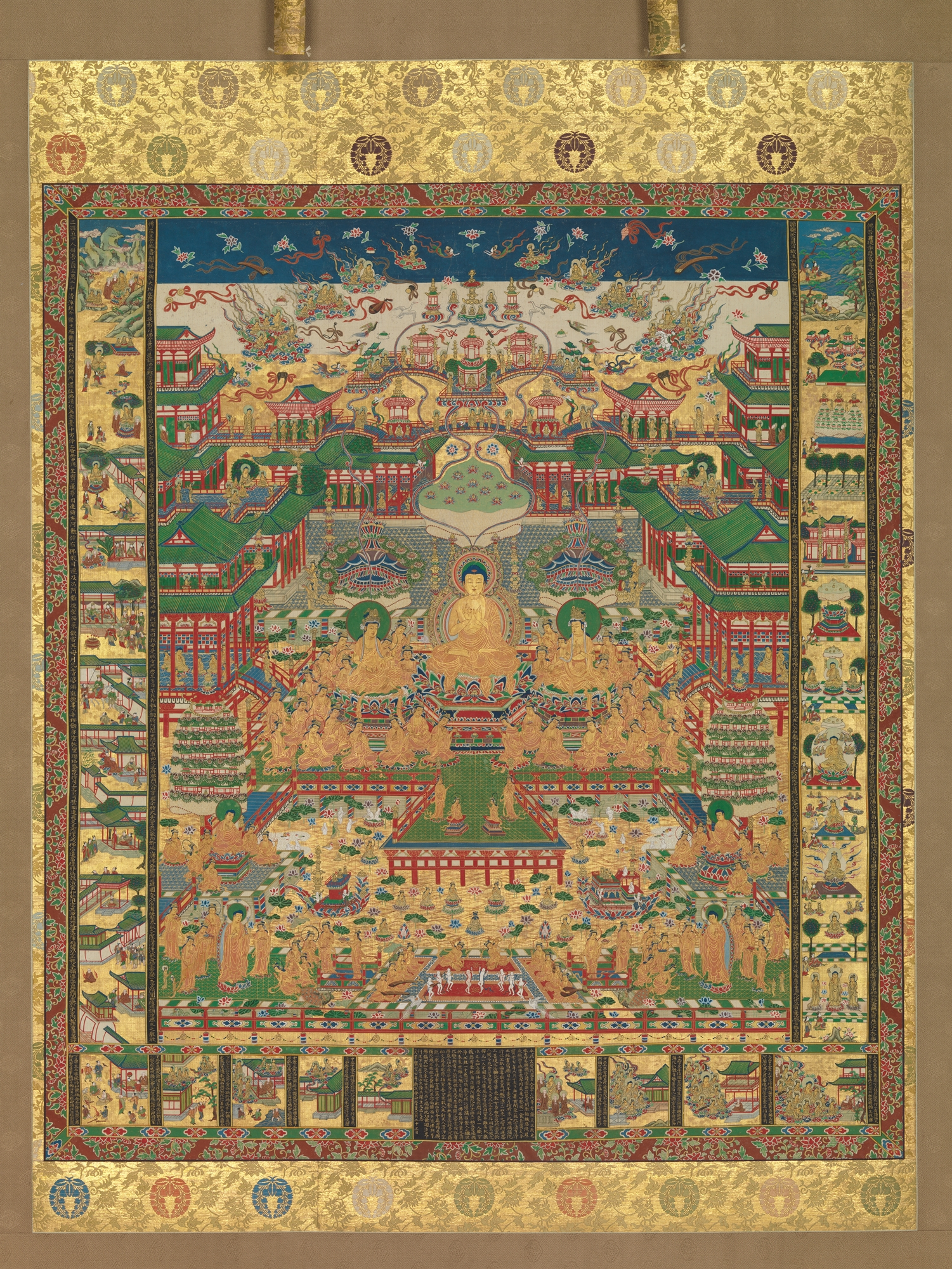
Japanese copy of the Pure Land Taima Mandala, which depicts Sukhavati, the most popular Pure Land destination in East Asian Buddhism, hanging scroll from 1750.

External audio
- Performed by the Ulster Orchestra under Takuo Yuasa
- Symphonic Poem "Flower of Mandala"

According to Katayama, the title refers to "beautiful flowers growing in Buddhist Heaven". Right after Saito finished the poem during his stay in Berlin, he received news of his father's death in Japan. Yamada, in a mystical view, interpreted the poem as an omen of his death. Saito's father had been called to Buddha's palace in paradise, covered by flowers of mandala. The poem reads as follows:

The sun is shining red in the night. I see the lights of the palace and an old man washing his eyes in the lake. I walk about this strange land. Then the old man passes me by and hurries to the palace. I walk after him only to lose sight of him. Feeling isolated and crying, I still go on walking and come up to a place, where madara no hanas lie scattered on the ground. The palace in the distance now shines brightly and I am enchanted by its beauty. But soon after that, it gets dark and only madara no hanas continue to go.

Harmonically, piece is centred around two intervals: the first is a perfect fourth (an ascending C-F) and a major third (a descending C-A flat). Katayama also offers poetic connections between the music and the poem; the work's opening ascending and augmented triad figure on harp and violin seems to portray "the sun shining red in the night". The ensuing lyrical oboe melody seems to evoke the "dim, mysterious world". Then, as the music turns more agitated and restless, it seems to portray "the son chasing after his father, and provoking uneasiness of death". Afterwards, a lyrical chorale-like melody gently descends, seemingly suggesting "the flowers of mandala falling and scattering", briefly interrupted by a sudden fortissimo that seems to represent Buddha's shining palace before the piece ends in ecstasy.

== Instrumentation ==
The work is scored for a larger orchestra than previous works by the composer.

Woodwinds

3 flutes
piccolo
2 oboes
cor anglais
2 clarinets in B♭
bass clarinet in B♭
2 bassoons
tenor saxophone

Brass

4 French horns in F
2 trumpets in B♭
3 trombones
tuba

Percussion

timpani

bass drum
cymbal
tam-tam
triangle

Strings

harp

violins I
violins II
violas
violoncellos
double basses

== Assessment ==
The symphonic poem has received a generally positive assessment from reviewers and music critics. Morihide Katayama praised the piece for its synthesis of dispare elements as well as "brief and fragile melodies, complex timbre, asymmetrical rhythm, soft tones and silence, and ambiguous sensibilities". He also claimed that Yamada's two symphonic poems paved the way for Tōru Takemitsu's music. Art lange, in a review of Fanfare noted the work's influences from Scriabin and Mussorgsky, its symbolism of death and paradise as well as its "lush, Impressionistic orchestration".

A review in AllMusic praised Yamada's symphonic poems, and remarked the following about "Flower of Mandala": "Yamada's Madara No Hana, the flowers in Buddhist Heaven, is an exquisitely beautiful work of serene ecstasy." Music critic David Hurwitz praised the work's more advanced use of harmony and colour, while recognizing the work's indebtedness to the music of Strauss. Two reviews by Colin Clarke and Jonathan Woolf found in MusicWeb International offer positive comments towards the piece, specially the former. Clarke remarks the following:

The sound-world Yamada conjures up here is decidedly more fragrant, almost French à la Ravel. It is here that Yamada’s sensitivity to orchestral sound and balance is most obviously on display and this makes for a most satisfying conclusion.

== Recordings ==
Conductor	Orchestra	Recording date	Formats	Labels	Catalogue ID	References
Takuo Yuasa	Ulster Orchestra	2000, released 2004	CD / Digital	Naxos Records	NAXOS 8.555350	
