= Symphony in F major (Yamada) =

1912 symphony by Kōsaku Yamada

- Triumph and Peace
- by Kōsaku Yamada
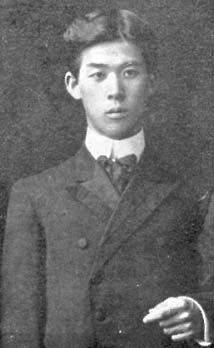
- Yamada in 1910
- Native name: 勝鬨と平和
- Period: Romanticism
- Melody: Kimigayo
- Composed: 1912
- Dedication: Koyata Iwasaki
- Published: 1997
- Publisher: Shunjusha Publishing Company
- Duration: 30–36 minutes
- Movements: 4

Premiere
- Date: December 6, 1914
- Location: Imperial Theatre, Tokyo
- Conductor: The composer
- Performers: Tokyo Philharmonic Society

The Symphony in F major, later subtitled "Triumph and Peace", was written by Kōsaku Yamada in 1912. Composed during his stay in Germany at the Prussian Academy of Arts, the work is closely modelled after the German romantic tradition in both language and form. Its opening pentatonic melody references the Kimigayo, which is both the Imperial anthem and Japan's national anthem. The work is notable for being the first symphony written by a Japanese composer, being dedicated to Koyata Iwasaki. The piece had to be reconstructed twice after a naval accident and the bombing of Tokyo.

== Background ==
With the beginning of the Meiji era, Japan quickly transformed from a feudal society to a modern nation state. As part of these changes, the country was widely Westernized, including its music. The Japanese government invited and hired musicians, composers and educators as part of the modernization program, such as Luther Whiting Mason, Franz Eckert, Rudolf Dittrich and John William Fenton, among others.

In 1875, Japanese educator Isawa Shūji travelled to the United States to study Western music. After his return in 1879 he established the Music Investigation Agency, a national research centre focused on Western music. Its main objective was to modernize Japanese music as well as its composition, performance, and educational techniques. In 1887 it became the Tokyo School of Music (now Tokyo University of the Arts), the first formal musical institution of the country. A division then formed between Japanese musicians and composers; those who remained within the Japanese tradition, and those who not only studied Western music, but began to imitate such styles. With the beginning of the 20th century, and specially during the Taishō era, elements of traditional Japanese music and Western classical music were gradually synthesized.

Reflecting this Westernization process, Yamada had grown exposed to the newly introduced Western military marches, as well as the protestant hymns of his mother's church. He began his music education in 1904 at the Tokyo School of Music, under German composers August Junker and Heinrich Werkmeister. In 1910, and thanks to the patronage of Japanese industrialist Koyata Iwasaki, Yamada moved to Germany where he enrolled in the Prussian Academy of Arts and studied composition under Max Bruch and Karl Leopold Wolf. There he was the first Japanese composer to write orchestral music in genres such as the overture, symphony and symphonic poem.

== Composition ==
The symphony was written in Berlin between 25 June and 18 November 1912, as an academy exercise. It was dedicated to Koyata Iwasaki. The work originally did not have a subtitle, "Triumph and Peace" being added after the outbreak of World War I in the Summer of 1914. The reason why is not explained by the composer, leaving Japanese music critic Morihide Katayama to offer some vague connections between the music and subtitle, such as "it contrasts and unites the triumphant hymn to victory and a calm prayer for peace."

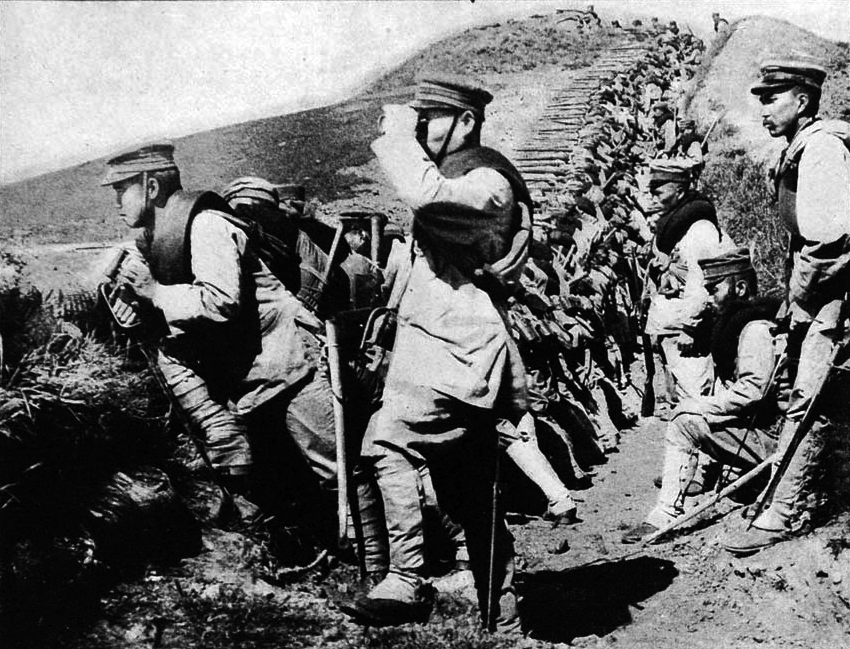
Soldiers of the 18th division, Imperial Japanese Army occupy an abandoned German trench during the Siege of Tsingtao, 1914

Due to the lack of performance opportunities in Germany, Yamada returned to Japan in 1913 hoping to return soon and establish himself in Europe. The outbreak of the war changed his plans, and from then on he dedicated himself to support Japanese classical music. The symphony was premiered at the Imperial Theatre on 6 December 1914, successfully performed by the Tokyo Philharmonic Society conducted by the composer. Musicians were grouped from a wide array of ensembles; the court orchestra, army and navy bands, and members of the Mitsukoshi boys' band and the Academy of Music. Up until then, classical music concerts in Japan had been conducted by Westerners and played western pieces, while on this occasion a fully Japanese orchestra and conductor played a Japanese composition.

In the U.S. it was first performed at Carnegie Hall on 24 January 1919. According to Yamada's testimony given in 1922, the manuscript and parts were lost in a maritime accident after its New York performance. The composer had to reconstruct the piece using a few parts that were left in the city. Unfortunately this reconstruction perished during the bombardments of Tokyo during World War II, alongside most of the composer's manuscripts. Yamada died in 1965 not having made further attempts to restore the piece. It wasn't until 1997 that the symphony was reconstructed again based on a few surviving parts, being published by the Shunjusha Publishing Company as the first volume of an anthology of works by the composer. The score was republished in 2016 in an authoritative edition by Craftone Editions.

== Instrumentation ==
The work is modestly scored for the standards of the time.

Woodwinds

2 flutes
2 oboes
2 clarinets
2 bassoons

Brass

2 horns
2 trumpets
2 trombones

Percussion

3 sets of timpani

Strings

Violins I
Violins II
Violas
Violoncellos
Double basses

== Form ==
Kimigayo on a piano; tempo 70

Score of "Kimi Ga Yo" including romanized pronunciation

External audio
- Performed by the Ulster Orchestra under Takuo Yuasa
- I. Moderato – Allegro molto
- II. Adagio non tanto e poco marciale
- III. Scherzo. Poco vivace
- IV. Adagio molto – Molto allegro e trionfante

The work is structured in four movements, employing largely traditional forms. The language is also conservative, reminiscent of Beethoven, Schumann, Brahms, and Schubert.

1. Moderato – Allegro molto
2. Adagio non tanto e poco marciale
3. Scherzo. Poco vivace
4. Adagio molto – Molto allegro e trionfante

The work's opening pentatonic melody references the Kimigayo, which is both the imperial anthem and Japan's national anthem. According to Katayama, "The fact that he began the first Western-style symphony with the national anthem witnesses Yamada's determination and confidence in supporting the Westernization and modernization of Japan." This is reinforced by the fact that the Kimigayo itself is derived from a Japanese poem set to music by John William Fenton. A new melody was adopted in 1880 composed by Yoshiisa Oku and Akimori Hayashi. The composer is often listed as Hiromori Hayashi, who was their supervisor and Akimori's father. Akimori was also one of Fenton's pupils. Although the melody is based on a traditional mode of Japanese court music (Gagaku), it is composed in a mixed style influenced by Western hymns, and uses some elements of the Fenton arrangement.

=== I. Moderato – Allegro molto ===
The first movement is structured in sonata form. It begins with a short moderato introduction in which a pentatonic melody is introduced. As mentioned before, it partially quotes the Kimigayo with the notes G-A-D-E. The allegro then ensues with a rhythmic and lively main theme in F major, contrasted by a rising, more melodic second theme in C major. The exposition is then repeated, an out of fashion element more akin classical and early romantic symphonies. The development section is more dramatic, as fragments of the main theme are transformed and modulate. Trumpet calls lead to the reappearance of the opening melody, followed by the recapitulation of the themes. A solemn coda ends the allegro.

=== II. Adagio non tanto e poco marciale ===
The second movement takes the form of a rondo (A–B–A'–C–A"–Coda). It opens with a stately main theme in B♭ major, presented in form of a march. It unfolds in a series of dialogues between woodwinds. A more lyrical second theme in G major is then introduced between strings and woodwinds, dominated by triplets. The main theme is then recapitulated, accompanied by a countermelody from flutes and horns. It leads to a noble and expansive third theme in D major, with rising woodwind phrases and horn triplets. The main theme is recapitulated once again, leading us to a solemn and peaceful coda. Both Ochi and Katayama point at the similarity of the music with the slow movements of Beethoven's Symphonies No. 6 and No. 9.

=== III. Scherzo. Poco vivace ===
The third movement is a scherzo also in rondo form (A–B–A'–C–A"–Coda). It begins with a rhythmic and agitated main theme in G minor, reminiscent of a European dance. The first trio section features a more melodic second theme in E♭ major, vaguely Slavonic in nature. The main theme is recapitulated with more syncopated rhythms. The second trio has a lyrical third theme in G major on strings, a simple canzonetta that is briefly unfolded before returning to the scherzo material, increasingly vigorous in its rhythms. A forceful coda ends the movement. Ochi points at the influence of Schubert found in the two trios.

=== IV. Adagio molto – Molto allegro e trionfante ===
The fourth movement is also structured as a sonata. It opens with an adagio introduction, woodwinds introducing a brooding theme in C minor. The music then modulates to F major, becoming serene and peaceful before a crescendo leads us into the molto allegro. A victorious main theme in F major is presented with resolute fanfares from horns and trumpets. A more rhythmic second theme in C major is also introduced, taking the form of a dotted march. As in the first movement, the exposition is repeated. The ensuing development begins as woodwinds reintroduce the main theme in a minor key, passing through a series of modulations before calmly appearing on strings. The material is then recapitulated in its original form. After a brief pause, a resolute chord ends the symphony. Katayama again points at the influence of Beethoven, while Ochi mentions Brahms's Symphony No. 1 as a likely inspiration.

== Assessment ==
A review in Allmusic describes the piece as "conventional" and "inconsequential". Art Lange, in a review from the magazine Fanfare, praised the piece with the following words:

The symphony, somewhat more serious in form and content, sweeps through intimations of Dvorák, Beethoven, and Schumann, comfortable in its old-fashioned, pastoral style, and certainly without a trace of the Sturm und Drang suggested by the title.

Jonathan Woolf ultimately labeled the work "a well-crafted treatise not a symphonic statement" in a review of MusicWeb International. Another review from the same medium by Colin Clarke is more positive.

The work is elegant, indeed suave, the whole evidently springing from a fertile well of ideas. There is even something endearingly balletic about some of the music. [...] The Wagnerian chords of the finale’s introduction may come as a surprise after all this and despite the rhythmic spring of the finale proper, the Wagnerisms continue to cast an intermittent shadow over proceedings.

Robert Cummings, in a review for ClassicalNet described the work as "light" and with "several catchy themes", ultimately being "a mixture of Mendelssohn and Elgar". Raymond Tuttle, on the other hand, offered a more nuanced view of the work:

Yamada seems to have learned his Schubert and Schumann well, because the Symphony repeatedly reminds me of those composers' works. Overall, the music, while traditional, is bold and assertive, full of confidence over Japan's new international role. If the structure of these two early works is redolent of the textbook, it should be no surprise, because during this period, Yamada was studying with the conservative Professor Wolf at the Musikhochschule.

A review found in Pizzicato also insisted on the influence of Mendelssohn and Schumann. Music critic David Hurwitz said the following about the piece: "The title of the symphony hardly prepares us for the placidly uneventful meandering that ensues".

== Recordings ==
Conductor	Orchestra	Recording date	Formats	Labels	Catalogue ID	References
Kazuo Yamada	Tokyo Metropolitan Symphony Orchestra	1983, released 1984	LP / CD	Victor Records	VDC-5501	
Takuo Yuasa	Ulster Orchestra	2001, released 2004	CD / Digital	Naxos Records	NAXOS 8.555350	
