= Overture in D major (Yamada) =

1912 overture by Kōsaku Yamada

- by Kōsaku Yamada
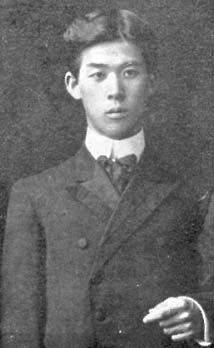
- Yamada in 1910
- Key: D major
- Period: Romanticism
- Genre: Overture
- Composed: 1912
- Published: 1997
- Publisher: Shunjusha Publishing Company
- Duration: 3 minutes
- Movements: 1

Premiere
- Date: May 23, 1915
- Location: Imperial Theatre, Tokyo
- Conductor: The composer
- Performers: Tokyo Philharmonic Society

The Overture in D major is an overture written by Japanese composer Kōsaku Yamada in 1912. Written during his stay in Germany at the Prussian Academy of Arts, the work follows the style of early Germanic romanticism, as represented by composers such as Felix Mendelssohn and Robert Schumann. It was premiered at the Imperial Theatre on 23 May 1915, performed by the Tokyo Philharmonic Society conducted by the composer. The overture is in the key of D major and structured as a sonatina, being notable for being the first orchestral piece written by a Japanese composer.

== Background ==
With the beginning of the Meiji era, Japan quickly transformed from a feudal society to a modern nation state. As part of these changes, the country was widely Westernized, including its music. The Japanese government invited and hired musicians, composers and educators as part of the modernization program, such as Luther Whiting Mason, Franz Eckert, Rudolf Dittrich and John William Fenton, among others.

In 1875, Japanese educator Isawa Shūji travelled to the United States to study Western music. After his return in 1879 he established the Music Investigation Agency, a national research centre focused on Western music. Its main objective was to modernize Japanese music as well as its composition, performance, and educational techniques. In 1887 it became the Tokyo School of Music (now Tokyo University of the Arts), the first formal musical institution of the country. A division then formed between Japanese musicians and composers: those who remained within the Japanese tradition; and those who not only studied Western music, but began to imitate such styles. With the beginning of the 20th century, and specially during the Taishō era, elements of traditional Japanese music and Western classical music were gradually synthesized.

Reflecting this Westernization process, Yamada had grown exposed to the newly introduced Western military marches, as well as the protestant hymns of his mother's church. He began his music education in 1904 at the Tokyo School of Music, under German composers August Junker and Heinrich Werkmeister. In 1910, and thanks to the patronage of Japanese industrialist Koyata Iwasaki, Yamada moved to Germany where he enrolled in the Prussian Academy of Arts and studied composition under Max Bruch and Karl Leopold Wolf. There he was the first Japanese composer to write orchestral music in genres such as the overture, symphony and symphonic poem.

== Composition and form ==
=== Composition ===
The piece was finished in Berlin on 22 March 1912 as an academy exercise, being the first piece of orchestral music written by a Japanese composer. It closely follows the style of early Germanic romanticism, as represented by composers such as Felix Mendelssohn and Robert Schumann. After graduating and due to the lack of performance opportunities in Germany, Yamada returned to Japan in 1913, hoping to return soon and establish in Europe. The outbreak of the war changed his plans, and from then on he dedicated himself to support Japanese classical music.

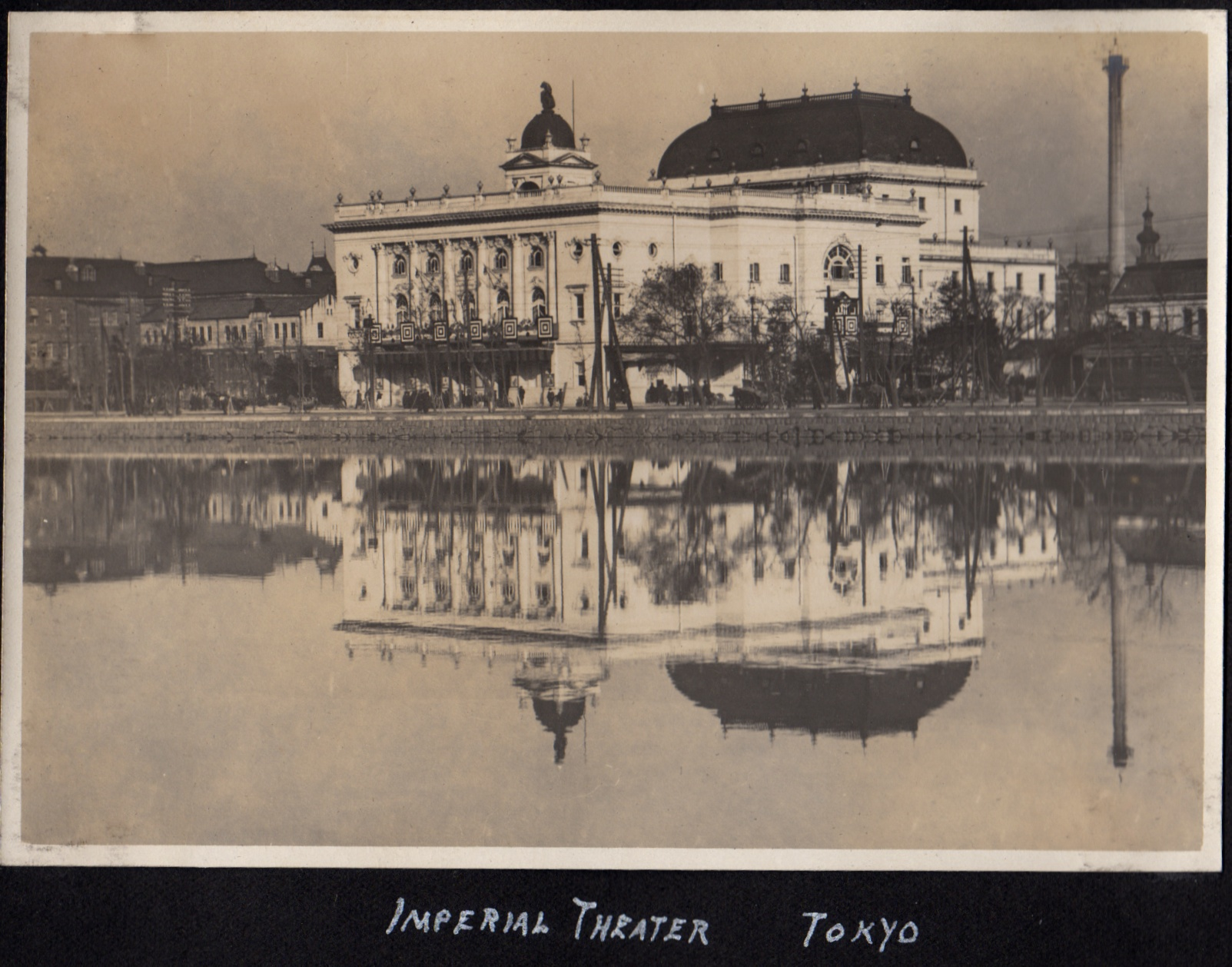
Photograph of the Imperial Theatre in 1915

The piece was premiered at the Imperial Theatre on 23 May 1915, performed by the Tokyo Philharmonic Society conducted by the composer in the orchestra's first public rehearsal. The original score has since been lost, possibly destroyed by the bombardments of Tokyo during World War II, which destroyed most of the composer's manuscripts. Only a third-party copy of the piece was conserved, which was published in 1997 by the Shunjusha Publishing Company as part of the first volume of an anthology of works by Yamada. This edition was filled with mistakes and discrepancies in articulation between the parts. An authoritative edition by Craftone Editions was published in 2016, which aimed to resolve these issues.

=== Form ===
External audio
- Performed by the New Zealand Symphony Orchestra under Takuo Yuasa
- Overture in D major

Structured in form of a sonatina, it bears the tempo mark allegro assai. It begins with a rhythmic main theme in D major. The second theme, in the dominant key of A major, is more melodic and gallant in character, presented with soft staccato notes and spiced with chromaticism. There is no development section, but instead a short transition, which leads to the recapitulation of the themes in the home key of D major. The overture then ends with a solemn coda. Japanese music critic Morihide Katayama described the piece as "a kind of challenge by the composer to Japanese traditional music" and "a bold step for Japanese musical westernization".

== Instrumentation ==
The work is very modestly scored for the standards of the time.

Woodwinds

2 flutes
2 oboes
2 clarinets
2 bassoons

Brass

2 horns
2 trumpets

Percussion

timpani

Strings

violins I
violins II
violas
violoncellos
double basses

== Assessment ==
A review in Allmusic describes the piece as "conventional" and "inconsequential". Art Lange, in a review from the magazine Fanfare, described the piece as "pure Mendelssohn in melody and spirit". Jonathan Woolf described the work with the following words: "The Overture has a pleasant fresh air chromaticism and is very competently orchestrated", and insisted on the piece's strict adherence to academic German models in a review of MusicWeb International. Another review from the same medium by Colin Clarke also links the work to Mendelssohn.

Conservatively scored [...] it is light, almost Mendelssohnian in its breeziness. It does not outstay its welcome and as one listens it becomes obvious that this is written with a very confident hand.

Robert Cummings, in a review for ClassicalNet described the work as "bright" and "festive", but ultimately "trifle". Raymond Tuttle (also in the same medium) puts more emphasis on the work's imitation of the Western style. A review found in Pizzicato described the work as "classical" in style. Music critic David Hurwitz is much more critical towards the overture, describing it as "musically trivial", "melodically bland and clumsily scored", all while recognizing its historical significance.

== Recordings ==
Conductor	Orchestra	Recording date	Formats	Labels	Catalogue ID	References
Takuo Yuasa	New Zealand Symphony Orchestra	2001, released 2004	CD / Digital	Naxos Records	NAXOS 8.555350	
