= Black ship (disambiguation) =

Black ship or Black ships may refer to:

- Black Ships (kurofune), a historical Japanese term for Western ships
- Kurofune (opera), a Japanese opera
- Kurofune (horse), a Japanese racehorse
- Black Ships Before Troy, a 1993 novel by Rosemary Sutcliff
- Black Ships, a 2008 novel by Jo Graham
- Black Submarine, an English band formerly called The Black Ships

== See also ==
- Mahogany Ship
