= Rofū Miki =

Japanese writer (1889–1964)

- 木操操
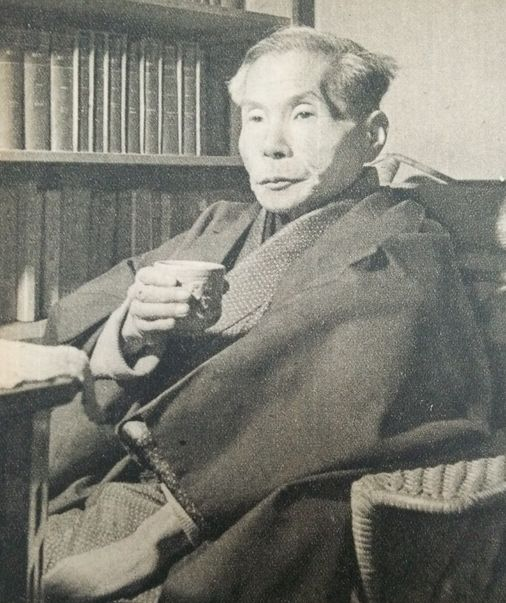
- Born: June 23, 1889; Tatsuno
- Died: December 29, 1964 (aged 75)
- Education: Waseda University, Keiō University
- Occupations: Writer, poet
- Writing career
- Language: Japanese
- Notable awards: Order of the Holy Sepulchre, Japanese Medal of Honor, Order of the Sacred Treasure

Masao Miki (Japanese: 三木 操, Hepburn: Miki Masao) (23 June 1889 – 29 December 1964), better known by his pen name Rofū Miki (三木 露風, Miki Rofū), was a Japanese poet, children's book author and essayist. He is considered a significant representative of Japanese symbolism.

== Life ==
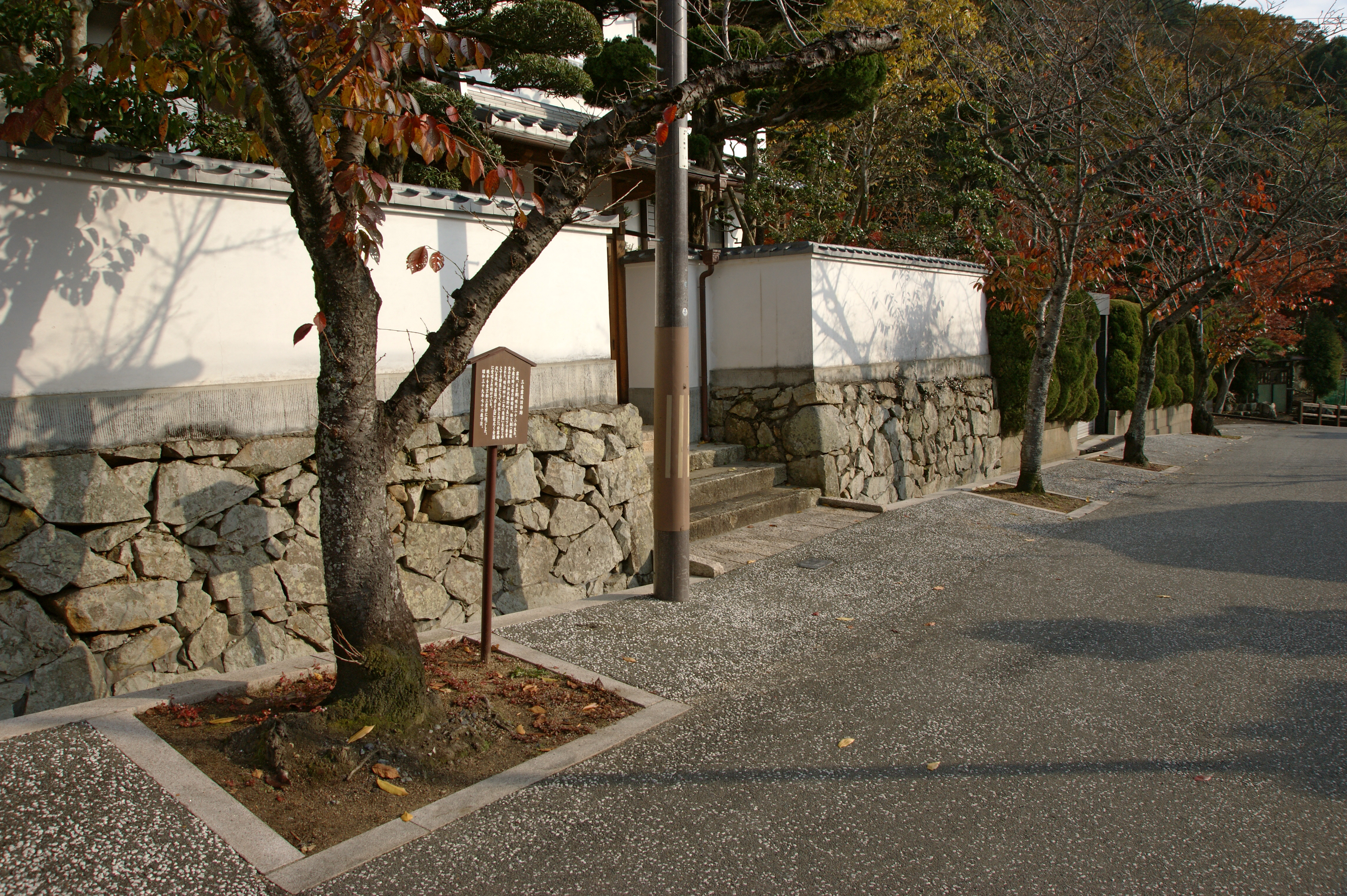
Rofū Miki's childhood home in Tatsuno

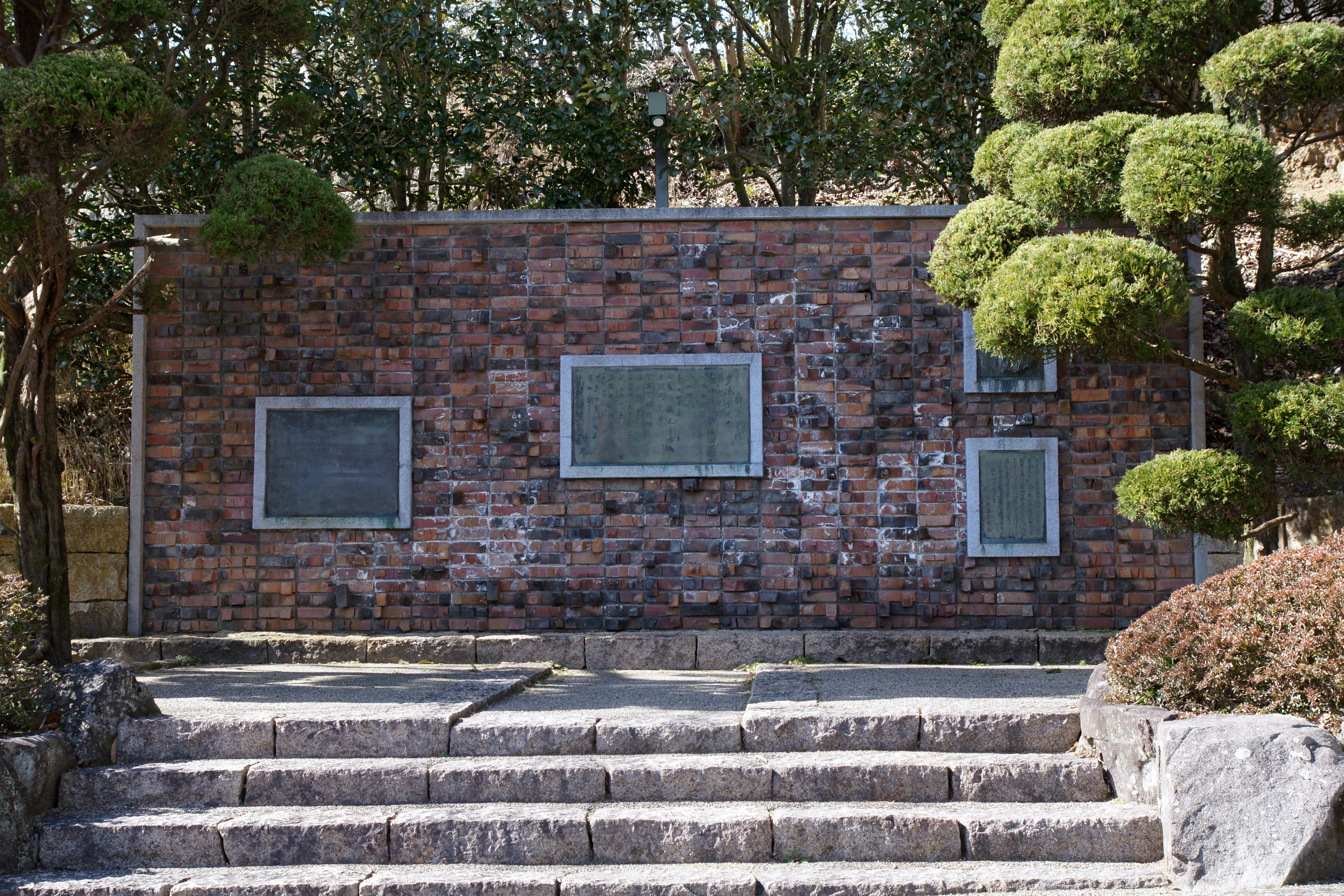
Monument to the song Akatombo in Miki's hometown (Tatsuno, Hyōgo)

Miki was born in Tatsuno in Hyōgo Prefecture in 1889, the oldest son of Setsujirō Miki and Kata Midorikawa (1869–1962). Midorikawa married at 15, and was a nurse and a significant figure in the women's movement of the Meiji period. He had one brother, Tsutomu. After the divorce of his parents in 1895 when he was 5 years old, Miki grew up with his grandfather, who was the first mayor of Tatsuno. He attended elementary and middle school in Tatsuno and wrote poems, haiku and tankas as a student.

At the age of 17, he published his first collection of poems, and at 20 his poetry collection Haien, which received attention at the time for its free verse. Miki was regarded as an early talent and he gained attention along with Hakushū Kitahara, to whom he has been compared in style and stature.

He studied literature at Waseda University and Keiō University. Around 1918, he joined Miekichi Suzuki's recently founded children's literature magazine Akai tori (赤い鳥, "Red Bird"), to which he contributed work, participating in the magazine's new movement to create high-quality, beautiful and emotional children's verses and songs, called dōyō.

Three years later he published a collection of verses for children named Shinjushima (真珠島, "Pearl Island"), which included the poem "Akatombo" (赤とんぼ, Akatonbo; "Red Dragonfly"), which Kosaku Yamada set to music in 1927. In 1989, "Akatombo" was voted Japan's favorite song in a survey by the NHK show "Japanese Songs, Hometown Songs". A large wall-sized monument to the song, with memorial plaques, stands in Miki's home town, Tatsuno.

From 1916 to 1924 Miki worked in Kamiiso, Hokkaido (modern day Hokuto) in a Trappist monastery as a teacher of literature. During this time, he was baptized in 1922 and joined the Catholic faith. His faith is reflected in the essays Shūdōin seikatsu (修道院生活) and Nihon katorikkukyōshi (日本カトリック教史, History of Catholicism in Japan).

In 1927, he was awarded the Holy Sepulchre of Jerusalem by the Vatican. In 1963 he was awarded the Japanese Medal of Honor with a purple ribbon.

On 21 December 1964, Miki was hit by a taxi and taken to hospital with head injuries. He died of a brain haemorrhage eight days later at the age of 75. Kosaku Yamada, who wrote the music to Akatombo, died on the same day one year later. He was awarded the Order of the Sacred Treasure in 1965. Since 1985, his hometown has been hosting a competition for children's songs, giving a prize named after him (三木露風賞, Miki Rofū-shō).

== Works (selected) ==
=== Poetry ===
- 1908 Yameru Bara (The Sick Rose)
- 1909 Haien (廃園, translated as The Ruined Garden or Abandoned Garden)
- 1910 Sabishiki akebono (寂しき曙)
- 1913 Rofūshū (露風集)
- 1915 Ryōshin (良心)
- 1920 Sei to ai (生と恋)
- 1921 Shinjushima (真珠島, Pearl Island)
- 1922 Shinkō no akebono (Dawn of Faith) (信仰の曙)
- 1926 Kami to hito (Gods and Men) (神と人)
- 1926 Torapisuto kashū (トラピスト歌集) – anthology

=== Essays ===
- 1925 Shūdōin sappitsu (修道院雑筆)
- 1926 Shūdōin seikatsu (修道院生活)
- 1928 Waga ayumeru michi (我が歩める道)
- 1929 Nihon katorikkukyōshi (日本カトリツク教史, History of Catholicism in Japan)
