= Nagauta Symphony =

Musical work; one-movement symphony composed by Kōsaku Yamada

The Nagauta Symphony is a symphony in one movement composed in 1934 by Japanese composer Kōsaku Yamada.

== Description ==
Kosaku Yamada was the first major Japanese composer to study the European tradition, and the first to write in the symphonic and operatic forms. He was responsible for introducing Japanese audiences to a broad range of the European orchestral tradition through his conducting. In his compositions, Yamada had been working to combine European traditions with Japanese classical music since at least 1921, when he composed Inno Meiji which combined Japanese and western instruments. Composed in 1934, the Nagauta Symphony represented the culmination of this work.

For this work, Yamada composed music for the western orchestra which is used to counterpoint a classical nagauta, the music which accompanies the kabuki. The symphony is subtitled Tsurukame after the name of the nagauta which is used. Composed in 1857, the text celebrates the Emperor of Japan and the imperial court. The symphony is in one movement with a duration of approximately 17 minutes.

== Instrumentation ==
The Nagauta Symphony uses a western orchestra and voices, as well as an ensemble of traditional Japanese musical instruments. The Japanese ensemble consists of several shamisen and percussion.

== Recordings ==
- Naxos Records (August 28, 2007)
  - Takuo Yuasa, Conductor
  - Tokyo Metropolitan Symphony Orchestra
  - Touon
