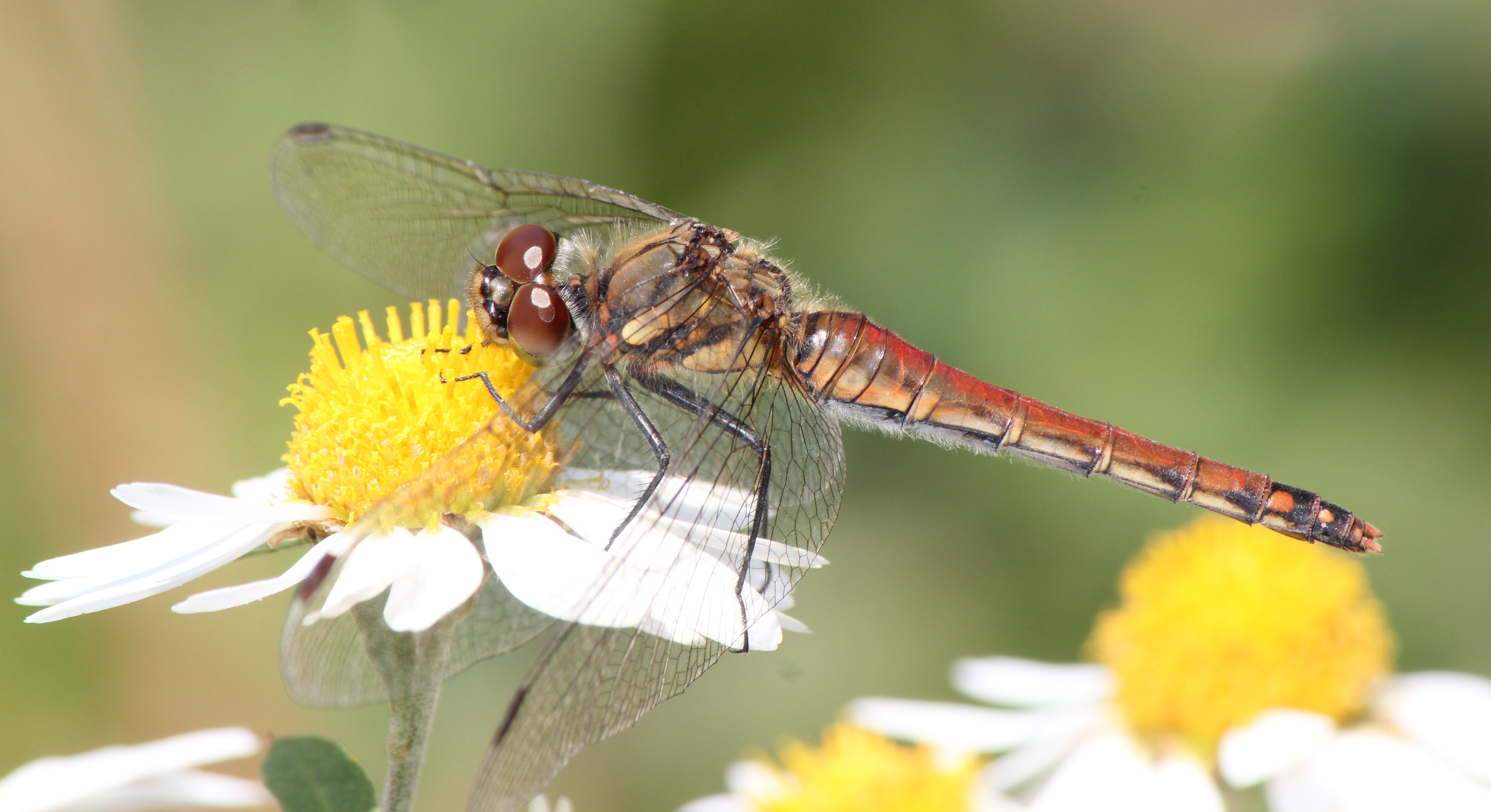

Scientific classification
- Kingdom: Animalia
- Phylum: Arthropoda
- Clade: Pancrustacea
- Class: Insecta
- Order: Odonata
- Suborder: Anisoptera
- Superfamily: Libelluloidea
- Family: Libellulidae
- Genus: Sympetrum
- Species: S. frequens

Binomial name
- Sympetrum frequens Sélys, 1883

= Sympetrum frequens =

Autumn darter

Species of dragonfly

Sympetrum frequens, the Autumn darter (アキアカネ, akiakane), is a species of dragonfly endemic to Japan. It lives near grasslands and can grow up to 40 mm in length. After emerging, these dragonflies migrate to high mountains where they feed until descending to breeding pools (often temporary or artificial, including rice fields) at lower levels.

== See also ==
- Akatombo—beloved Japanese song about this dragonfly
