= Akatombo =

Japanese children's song by Yamada Kōsaku

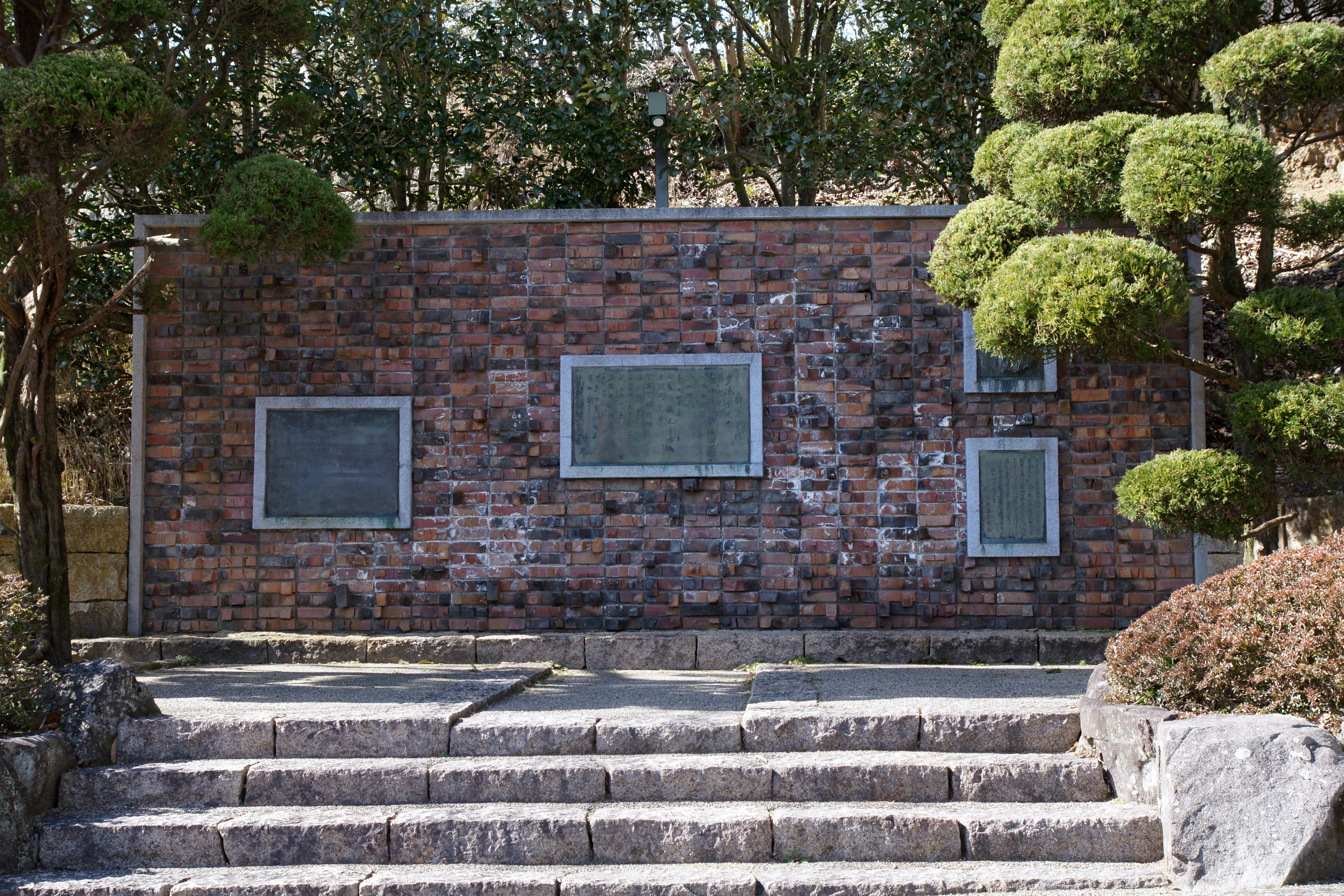
- Monument to the song in the hometown of the poet Rofū Miki (Tatsuno, Hyōgo)
- English: Red Dragonfly; Scarlet Dragonfly
- Native name: 赤とんぼ
- Written: 1921
- Text: by Rofū Miki
- Language: Japanese
- Melody: by Kōsaku Yamada
- Composed: 1927

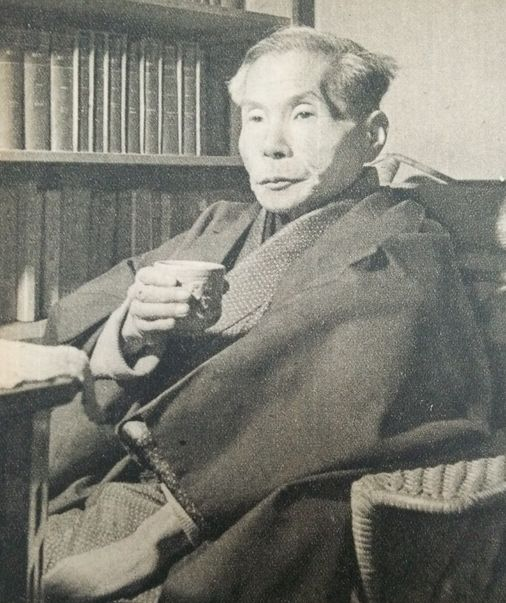
Rofū Miki (1948)

"Red Dragonfly" (Japanese: 赤とんぼ, Hepburn: Akatonbo) (also transliterated as Akatombo, Aka Tombo, Aka Tonbo, or Aka Tomba) is a famous Japanese children's song (dōyō) composed by Kōsaku Yamada in 1927, with lyrics from a 1921 poem by Rofū Miki. It is a nostalgic depiction of a Japanese red dragonfly seen at sunset by an infant being carried on an older sister's shoulder.

== Text ==
The poem is written in the voice of someone recalling his infancy and being carried on the back of his sister (or nursemaid; the Japanese lyrics are ambiguous). The speaker now longs for this mother figure, who married at the age of 15, moved far away, and no longer sends news back to the speaker's village.

Symbolist poet Rofū Miki (1889–1964), who wrote the poem in 1921, had a similar background. His mother had been married at the age of 15. His parents divorced when Miki was five years old, and his mother moved away, never to return. He was thereafter raised by his paternal grandfather. When he was 12 years old, ten years before the publication of the poem, he wrote its final three lines:

Little red dragonfly
Resting, waiting
On the end of a bamboo pole

Miki's mother, Kata Midorikawa, became a significant figure in the women's movement during Japan's Meiji period. She died at age 91 in 1962, and her gravestone was inscribed with the words “At rest here, little dragonfly’s mother”. Miki himself died two years later, age 76, after being struck by a vehicle.

In her 2016 book Music in Contemporary Japan, Japanese music and culture commentator Jennifer Milioto Matsue wrote:

The song uses the imagery of red dragonflies to evoke nostalgic feelings of the past and of course for the old country home of the furusato [hometown]. ... [It] prompts longing feelings for all "mothers" in all our childhoods. These lines similarly capture the loss felt when loved ones move away, an increasingly common occurrence in the rapid urbanization of modern Japan in the early twentieth century.

== Melody ==
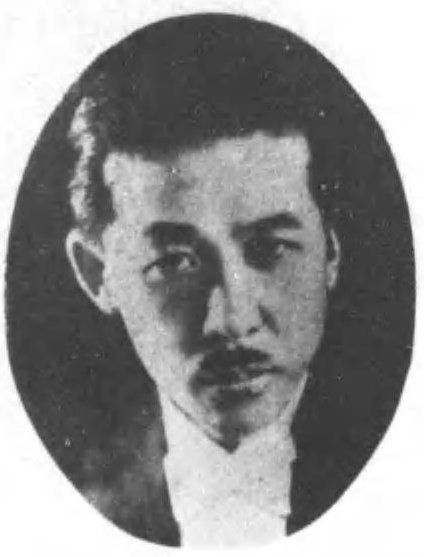
Kōsaku Yamada (1935)

Composer Kōsaku Yamada (1886–1965) was an intimate friend of Miki, and set his 1921 poem to music in 1927.

Yamada was one of several respected Japanese classical-music composers and poets who in the 1920s sought to create songs for children that were more beautiful and emotional than the standard children's songs of the time – especially the songs prescribed by the Ministry of Education, Science and Culture – which were pedantic, patriotic, and moralistic. The new style of songs were called dōyō, and they are not merely children's songs but also art songs for adults. Yamada's collection, 100 Children's Songs by Kosaku Yamada, was published in 1927 in the early months of the Shōwa period of the Empire of Japan, and established an enduring style of Japanese song.

The melody of "Akatombo" is in a type of pentatonic scale called yonanuki, here yonanuki chō-onkai (ヨナ抜き長音階), a major scale without the fourth and seventh step, which is based on the Western octave scale with notes four and seven removed; this scale became important in early 20th-century Japan and appealed to both Japanese and Western musical sensibilities. Yamada's music during the 1920s and 1930s successfully avoided the pitfall of many contemporaneous Japanese composers, who created awkward hybrids in their attempts to bridge the gap between Western and Japanese music. His music is closer to Japanese melodic ideas, and eschews the formal structural relationships of Western harmony. Matsue describes Yamada's "Akatombo" as follows: "[T]he vocal melody is quite simple but emotive .... [T]he harmonization on the piano ... is simple and unobtrusive, supporting the elegant lyrical line."

Yamada was influenced by the works of Robert Schumann and other German composers, and the main phrase of this song closely resembles a musical theme that is prominently repeated numerous times in Schumann's Concert Allegro with Introduction for Piano and Orchestra, Op. 134 (1853).

"Akatombo" is one of three lyric songs by Yamada using verses by Miki. Miki and Yamada both died on 29 December, their deaths exactly one year apart.

== Recognition ==
In a 1989 nationwide survey by the NHK, "Akatombo" was ranked as by far the most-loved song in Japan.

In 2007, the Japanese Ministry of Education, Culture, Sports, Science and Technology's Agency for Cultural Affairs included it on their list of 100 Japanese Songs widely beloved in Japan.

In 2008 the Japan Mint issued six denominations of legal tender "Aka Tombo" coins in honor of the song.

A large wall-sized monument to the song, with memorial plaques, stands in Tatsuno, Hyōgo Prefecture, the hometown of the poet Rofū Miki.

The song is often broadcast via outdoor speakers as part of the "5 o-clock chimes" Goji no chaimu (5時のチャイム), which mark the end of the day in many Japanese cities.

== Arrangements ==
French flautist Jean-Pierre Rampal with his frequent performing partner Lily Laskine on harp, recorded an Akio Yashiro transcription of the song on their 1978 LP Japanese Melodies for Flute and Harp. On his 1982 album Yamanakabushi: Japanese Melodies, Vol. III, Rampal played a longer Yashiro arrangement of the song with Shinichi Yuize, Yasuko Nakashima, and Utae Uno on kotos.

In her 1981 work Variations on Themes of Japanese Songs (こどものためのピアノ曲集, Nihon no uta hensōkyokushū), commissioned by Kawai Musical Instruments, pianist and composer Haruna Miyake includes a variation of "Akatombo" written when she was twelve years old.

Anne Akiko Meyers, on her 1994 CD Salut d'Amour, played an arrangement for violin and piano by Shigeaki Saegusa.

British flautist William Bennett with Clifford Benson on piano, recorded the song in an arrangement for flute by Teruyuki Noda on their 1995 CD Melody of Japan.
