= Kurofune (opera) =

1940 opera by Kōsaku Yamada

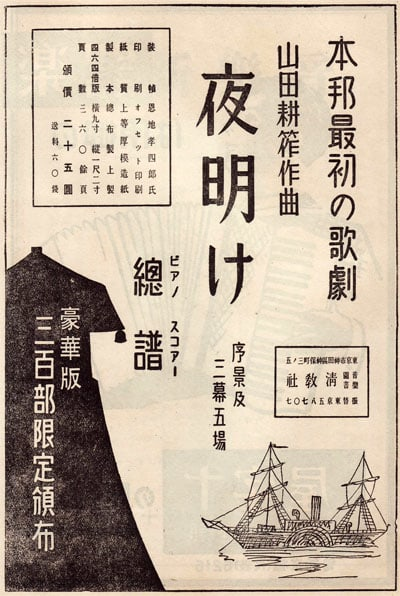
The opera's piano roll score cover

Kurofune (Japanese: 黒船 kurofune, an Edo-period term meaning "black ships") is a 1940 Japanese-language Western-style opera by Kosaku Yamada, which is regarded as the first Japanese opera. It is based on the Black Ships story of Tōjin Okichi, a geisha "caught up in the turmoil that swept Japan in the waning years of the Tokugawa shogunate".

The American ships were steam powered, which impressed the Japanese at the time. Arriving at Shimoda, they conveyed messages to open up Japan to trade.

Synopsis

The time is the final years of the Tokugawa shogunate; The place, the port of Shimoda, newly opened by the United States–Japan Treaty of Peace and Amity. The vagrant samurai Yoshida, an imperial loyalist, bursts into a drinking party of the town magistrate and officials, makes an impassioned speech calling on them to "expel the barbarians," and disappears, but the geisha Okichi, who happens to be present, is given the mission of assassinating the American consul-general. She becomes the consul's mistress, but is torn between her growing feelings for his kindness toward her and her duty to kill him. Losing patience with all this, Yoshida steals into the temple Ryosen-ji that serves as the consulate, and draws his sword. He is on the verge of killing the consul when a messenger arrives from Kyoto conveying the Emperor's desire for peace.
