= Pizzicato (magazine) =

- Editor-in-chief: Remy Franck
- Categories: Classical Music
- Frequency: daily updates
- Publisher: Orkite a.s.b.l
- Founded: 1991
- Country: Luxembourg
- Language: German / English
- Website: www.pizzicato.lu

Pizzicato is a magazine formerly published monthly in Luxembourg by Artevents Ltd., devoted to classical music. Since 2013 it is an Internet only magazine with daily updates. It is now published by Orkite a.s.b.l The magazine contains news, features and interviews as well as CD and DVD reviews. It was founded in 1991 by the Luxembourgish journalist Remy Franck. He is also editor-in-chief of the magazine, which is a member in the Jury of the International Classical Music Awards, ICMA. It also has its own Supersonic Award.

Pizzicato has an average of 177.803 monthly visitors (1st semester 2025) – Geographical distribution: Germany, Switzerland, Austria 60%, Luxembourg 10%, USA 10%, other 20% – Pages read per month (Average 1st semester 2021): 1.037.674
