= Kōsaku Yamada =

Japanese musical artist (1886–1965)

- 山田 耕筰
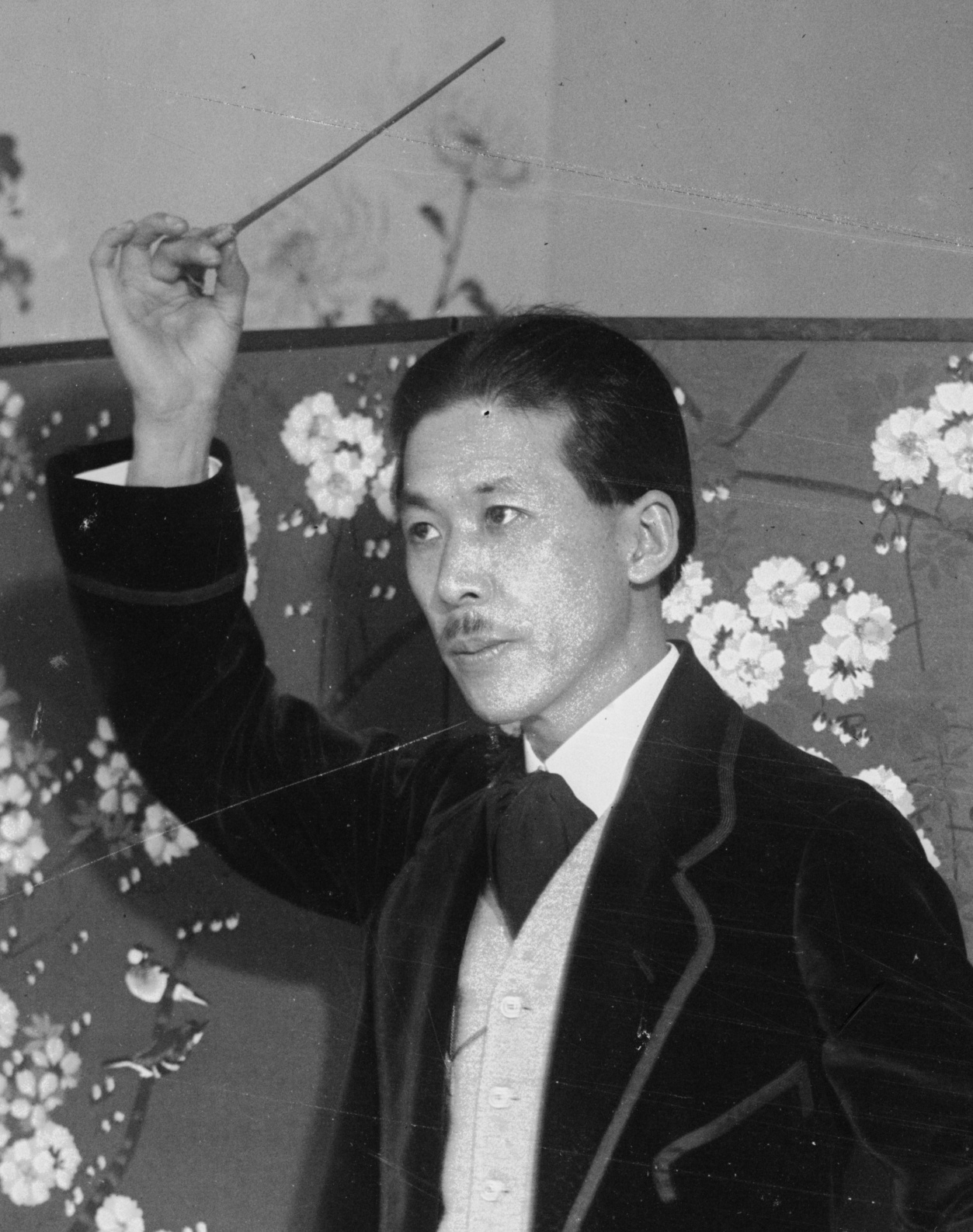
- Kōsaku Yamada, circa 1915
- Born: June 9, 1886; Tokyo, Japan
- Died: December 29, 1965 (aged 79); Tokyo, Japan
- Education: Tokyo Music School
- Relatives: Tsuneko Gauntlett (sister); George Edward Luckman Gauntlett (brother-in-law)

Kōsaku Yamada (山田 耕筰, Yamada Kōsaku; June 9, 1886 – December 29, 1965) was a Japanese composer and conductor.

== Name ==
In older Western reference sources, his name is given as Kôsçak Yamada.

== Biography ==
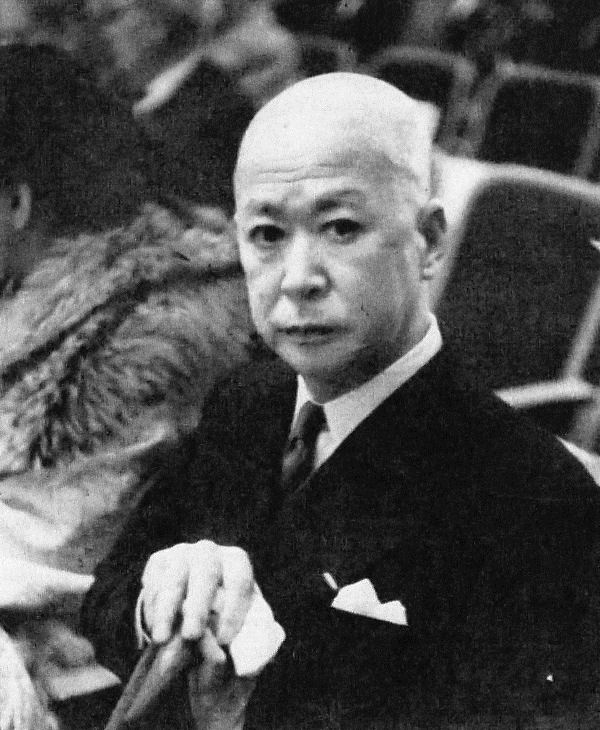
Kosaku Yamada, 1956

Born in Tokyo, Yamada started his music education at Tokyo Music School in 1904, studying there under German composers August Junker and Heinrich Werkmeister. In 1910, he left Japan for Germany where he enrolled at the Prussian Academy of Arts and learnt composition under Max Bruch and Karl Leopold Wolf and piano under Carl August Heymann-Rheineck, before returning to Japan in late 1913. He travelled to the United States in 1918 for two years. During his stay in Manhattan, New York City, he conducted a temporarily organized orchestra composed of members of New York Philharmonic and New York Symphony, shortly before their amalgamation.

The beginning of his Symphony in F major, "Triumph and Peace" (1912) has a pentatonic theme G-A-D-E which reflects the Japanese national anthem based on Gagaku. This symphony was the first complete symphony with four movements composed in Japan.

His Sinfonia "Inno Meiji" (1921) includes Japanese instruments such as the hichiriki, an ancient Japanese double reed wind instrument, and other Asian instruments.

Yamada composed about 1,600 musical works, in which art songs (Lieder) amount to 700 even excluding songs commissioned by schools, municipalities and companies. Akatombo (Red Dragonfly) (1927) is perhaps his most famous song. His songs have been performed and recorded by many famous singers such as Kathleen Battle, Ernst Haefliger and Yoshikazu Mera.

Yamada's opera Kurofune (black ships) is regarded as one of the most famous Japanese operas. His work was heard at the music section of the art competition at the 1936 Summer Olympics.

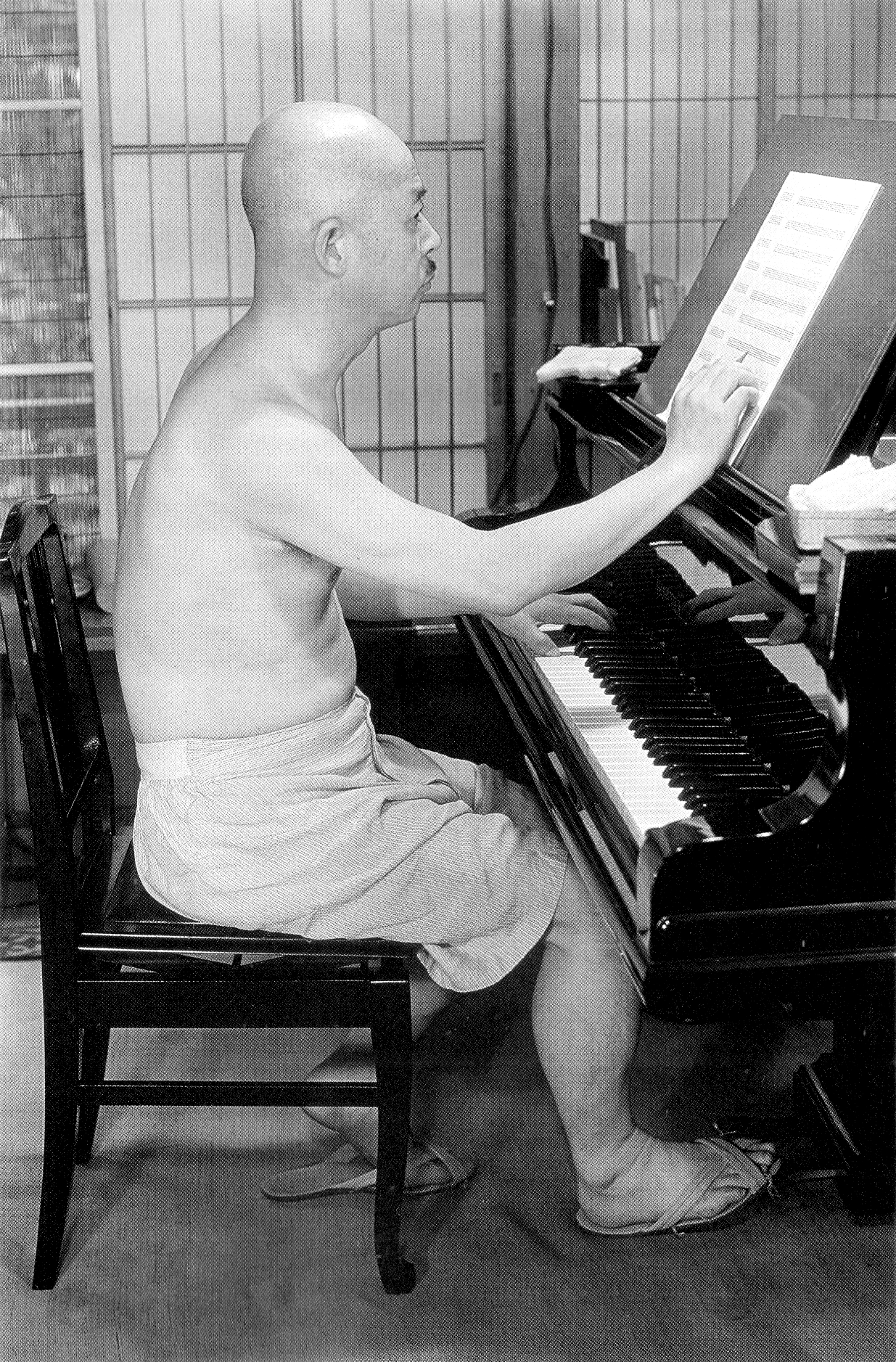
Kosaku Yamada in 1942, photo by Domon Ken

As a conductor, Yamada made an effort to introduce western orchestral works to Japan. He gave the premieres, in Japan, of Debussy's Prélude à l'après-midi d'un faune, Dvořák's Symphony No. 9, Gershwin's An American in Paris, Mosolov's Iron Foundry, Sibelius' Finlandia, Shostakovich's Symphony No. 1, Johann Strauss II's An der schönen blauen Donau, and Wagner's Siegfried Idyll.

Jacques Ibert's Ouverture de fête was dedicated to the Japanese emperor and government for the 2,600th National Foundation Day in 1940 and premiered under the baton of Yamada.

Yamada died at his home in Tokyo of a heart attack on December 29, 1965, and was survived by his wife, Teruko.

== Major compositions ==
Operas

- Ayame [Iris] (1931)
- Kurofune [Black Ships] (1940)
- Hsìang-fei (1946) (four acts, seven scenes with a proemnia – see Xiang Fei)

Other stage works

- Maria Magdalena for ballet, after the drama by M. Maeterlinck (1916) (piano sketches were complete, but are now lost; the sketches were never developed)

Orchestral works

- Overture in D major (1912)
- Symphony in F major "Triumph and Peace" (1912)
- Kurai Tobira, symphonic poem (1913)
- Flower of Mandala, symphonic poem (1913)
- Choreographic Symphony "Maria Magdalena" (1916–18) (written from sketches for a ballet; first performed in Carnegie Hall)
- Sinfonia "Inno Meiji" (1921)
- Nagauta Symphony "Tsurukame" for voice, shamisen and orchestra (1934)

Chamber works

- String Quartet No. 1 in F major
- String Quartet No. 2 in G major
- String Quartet No. 3 in C minor
- Hochzeitsklänge for piano quintet (1913)
- Chanson triste japonaise for violin and piano (1921)
- Suite japonaise for violin and piano (1924)
- Variations on Kono-michi for flute and piano (1930)

Works for piano

- New Year's Eve (1903)
- Variationen (1912)
- The Chimes of the Dawn (1916)
- Les poèmes à Scriabin (1917)
- Karatachi-no-hana for piano solo (1928)

Choral works

- Die Herbstfeier for mixed chorus and orchestra (1912)

Songs

- "Song of Aiyan" (1922)
- "Chugoku chihō no komoriuta" [Lullaby from the Chugoku Area]
- "Karatachi no hana"
- "Pechika"
- "Kono michi" [This Road]
- "Akatombo" [Red Dragonfly] (1927)
- "Yuu-in"
- "Sabishiki Yoruno Uta" [Songs of Lonely Night] (1920)

== Recordings ==
- Yamada Kosak Memorial Album – Quince Blossoms – Columbia BLS-4001 (1966?)
- "Aka Tombo" recorded by Jean-Pierre Rampal (flute) and Ensemble Lunaire, Japanese Folk Melodies transcribed by Akio Yashiro, CBS Records, 1978
- Kósçak Yamada, Overture in D major, Symphony in F major 'Triumph and Peace', and symphonic poems The Dark Gate and Madara No Hana, Ulster Orchestra and New Zealand Symphony Orchestra, dir. Takuo Yuasa. Naxos, 2004
- Kósçak Yamada, Nagauta Symphony "Tsurukame", Inno Meiji, Maria Magdalena, Tokyo Metropolitan Symphony Orchestra, dir. Takuo Yuasa. Naxos, 2007
