= Kazuo Yamada =

Japanese conductor and composer (1912–1991)

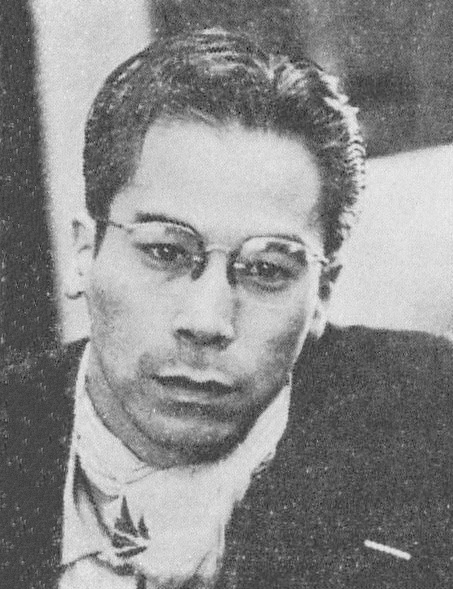
- Born: 19 October 1912; Tokyo, Japan
- Died: 13 August 1991 (aged 78); Tokyo, Japan
- Resting place: Tokyo, Japan
- Other name: 山田 一雄
- Occupation: Conductor

Kazuo Yamada (山田 一雄, Yamada Kazuo; 19 October 1912 – 13 August 1991) was a Japanese conductor and composer.

== Early life ==
Kazuo Yamada was born in Tokyo in 1912. He began studies at Gakushuin and then Tokyo University of the Arts (formerly the Tokyo Music School). Studied piano with Leo Sirota and Paul Weingarten, and composition with Klaus Pringsheim, and graduated at the top of his class.

== Career ==
Yamada formed the orchestra 'Promethée' as a composer. In 1937 he was awarded his first prize from the Japan Broadcasting Corporation for his symphonic music works, and in 1938 he was also awarded by the New Symphony Orchestra for his symphonic poem 'Songs that youth can sing' as well as the Weingarten Award for the symphonic 'Kiso'.

Yamada studied conducting technique under the tutelage of Józef Rosenstock, and premiered as a conductor for the New Symphony Orchestra in 1940. He was appointed to the post of chief conductor of the Japan Symphony Orchestra which was reorganized from the New Symphony Orchestra (which is now the NHK symphony orchestra) in 1942, greatly contributing to the improvement of the orchestra for the next 13 years. He was awarded the Mainichi Music Award in 1949 for the Japan premiere of the opera Hänsel und Gretel sponsored by NHK, and he contributed immeasurably to many Japan premieres of works such as Symphonies No. 2 and No. 8 (Mahler), Symphony No. 5 (Shostakovich), Don Quixote (R. Strauss), Six Pieces for Orchestra (Webern), The Rite of Spring (Stravinsky), Le roi David (Honegger) and Sept haïkaï (Messiaen).

Yamada's activities overseas gradually began to take off from 1955, where he guest conducted European orchestras such as the USSR Symphony Orchestra, Slovak Philharmonic, Dresden Philharmonic, as well as orchestras in North and South America and South Africa, and he moreover recorded with the Vienna Symphony Orchestra in 1988.

In 1976, Yamada was awarded the Medal with Purple Ribbon (for artistic excellence) by the Government of Japan, and in 1978 he firmly established his reputation for excellence in the 'World of Kazuo Yamada' series of performances. He was further awarded the Minister of Education Award for Fine Arts in 1979, the Order of the Rising Sun, Gold Rays with Rosette, Fourth Class in 1984, and the Japan Art Academy Award in 1986.

Yamada held a number of key posts such as Chief Resident Conductor & Artistic Advisor of the Kyoto Symphony Orchestra, Artistic Director of the Gunma Symphony Orchestra, Honorary Conductor of the Japan Shinsei Symphony Orchestra, Music Director of the Nissho Chorus, Chairman of the Japan Mahler Society, Professor of the Tokyo University of the Arts, and gave stellar performances as Guest Conductor in Japan as well as overseas.

Yamada was appointed to the post of Music Director of the Kanagawa Philharmonic in 1991 until his sudden demise on 13 August in the same year at 78 years of age.

A live recording of Yamada conducting Symphony No. 9 (Mahler) with the New Japan Philharmonic was released in 2011, a quarter-century after the 1986 performance, which was awarded the Grand Prize for recording in the Arts Festival of the Japan Ministry for Cultural Affairs.

== Major works ==
- Violin Sonata
- Sonata for Cello Solo
- String Quartet No. 1
- Notturno for flute and piano
- From Soshigaya for voice and piano
