= Rudolf Dittrich =

Austrian musician (1861–1919)

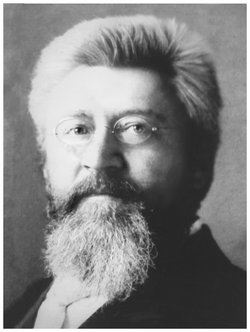
- Born: 25 April 1861; Biala, Galicia, Austria-Hungary
- Died: 16 January 1919 (aged 57); Vienna, Austria
- Occupations: musician, composer
- Spouse: Katharina Kriegle (m. 1900)
- Partner: Mori Kiku (1891–1894)
- Children: 1 son (Kiku), 2 sons (Kriegel)

Rudolf Dittrich (25 April 1861 – 16 January 1919) was an Austrian musician. He is noted for his role in bringing western music to Japan during the late 19th century.

== Biography ==
Dittrich was born in Biala, Galicia (modern Bielsko-Biała, Poland). He attended the Vienna Conservatory, where he specialized in violin, piano, organ, and music composition. His teachers included Anton Bruckner, who later became one of his sponsors.

In November 1886, Dittrich married a singer named Petronella Josefine Leopoldine Lammer (15 September 1860 - 4 January 1891).

Dittrich was hired by the Meiji government of Japan as a foreign advisor on a three-year contract and arrived in Tokyo in 1888 as the first Art Director of the Tokyo School of Music (now the Tokyo National University of Fine Arts and Music). Dittrich and his wife both worked at the school, and also gave performances at the Rokumeikan. Dittrich was fluent in English, and also taught his students English conversation along with violin, piano, organ, theory, and composition. However, he was known as a very severe teacher, and at one point his students marched out on strike against him. However, many of his students went on to distinguished careers.

Near the end of Dittrich's first term in 1891, his wife died from a pulmonary embolism. Furthermore, the school faced financial difficulties as the government withdrew its support to divert funds for the upcoming First Sino-Japanese War. In spite of his school's difficulties, Dittrich's contract was renewed in 1891 for another three-year period.

Sometime in 1891 or 1892, Dittrich formed a relationship with a Japanese shamisen performer and instructor, Mori Kiku, with whom he had a son out of wedlock named Otto Mori. Mori Kiku also assisted Dittrich in translating the lyrics and transposing the music for the Japanese songs which appeared in his 1894 and 1895 publications.

Dittrich left Japan one month before the expiration of his contract in August 1894, abandoning his common-law family, but leaving provisions to provide financial support for his son, who later became a professional violinist. His grandson was the movie actor Jun Negami.

After returning to Vienna in 1894, Dittrich had to struggle to find a position. In the first years after his return he performed as a chamber music violinist and violist. In 1901, he was appointed as one of three Habsburg court organists, succeeding his mentor Anton Bruckner. In 1906 Dittrich became a professor at the Vienna Conservatory, and wrote for the organ in the Musikverein auditorium, where the Vienna Philharmonic plays its New Year's concerts.

On 10 July 1900 Dittrich married his second wife, Katharina Kriegle, who bore him two sons.

Dittrich collapsed while performing in a concert on 18 October 1916, and never fully recovered. He died in Vienna on 16 January 1919.

== Publications ==
After returning to Europe in 1894, Dittrich published two collections consisting of piano arrangements of traditional Japanese songs.

- Nippon Gakufu ("Six Japanese Popular Songs collected and arranged for the Pianoforte"), Breitkopf and Härtel, Leipzig, 1894.
- Nippon Gakufu, Second Series ("Ten Japanese Songs collected and arranged for the Pianoforte"), Breitkopf and Härtel, Leipzig, 1895.

== Links ==
- Free scores by Rudolf Dittrich at the International Music Score Library Project (IMSLP)
