= Imperial Theatre (Tokyo) =

Theater in Chiyoda, Tokyo

Coordinates: 35°40′35.5″N 139°45′38.7″E

- 帝国劇場
- Teigeki (帝劇)
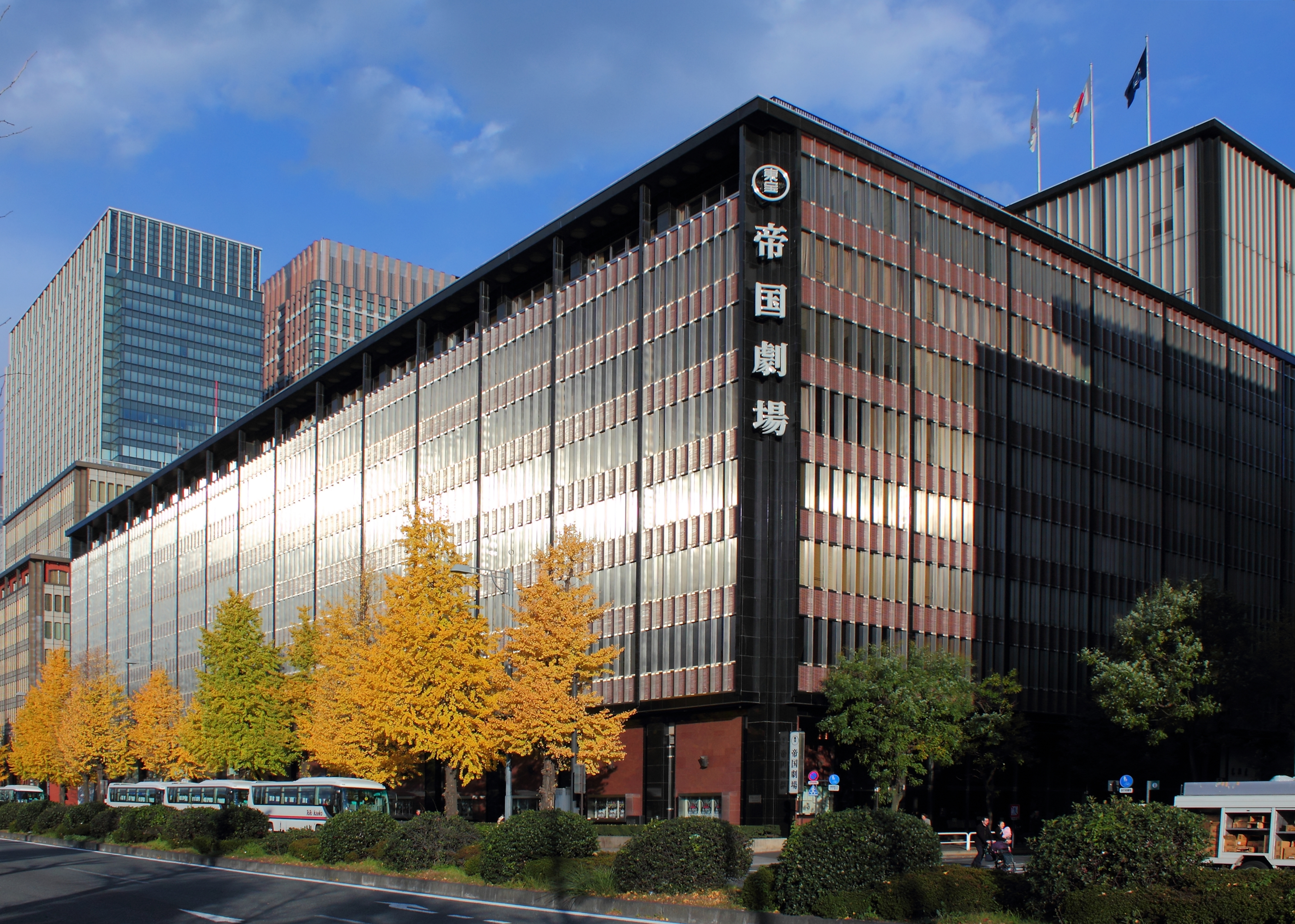
- Imperial Theatre
- Interactive map of Imperial Theatre
- Address: 3-1-1 Marunouchi
- Location: Chiyoda, Tokyo, Japan
- Owner: Toho
- Seating type: Reserved
- Capacity: 1,897
- Type: Indoor theatre

Construction
- Groundbreaking: 1963
- Built: 1964
- Opened: 1966
- Closed: 2025
- Demolished: February 2025

Website
- Theatre website

The Imperial Theatre (帝国劇場, Teikoku Gekijō), often referred to simply as the Teigeki (帝劇), and previously the Imperial Garden Theater, was a Japanese theater located in Marunouchi, Chiyoda, Tokyo, Japan operated by Toho.

== History ==
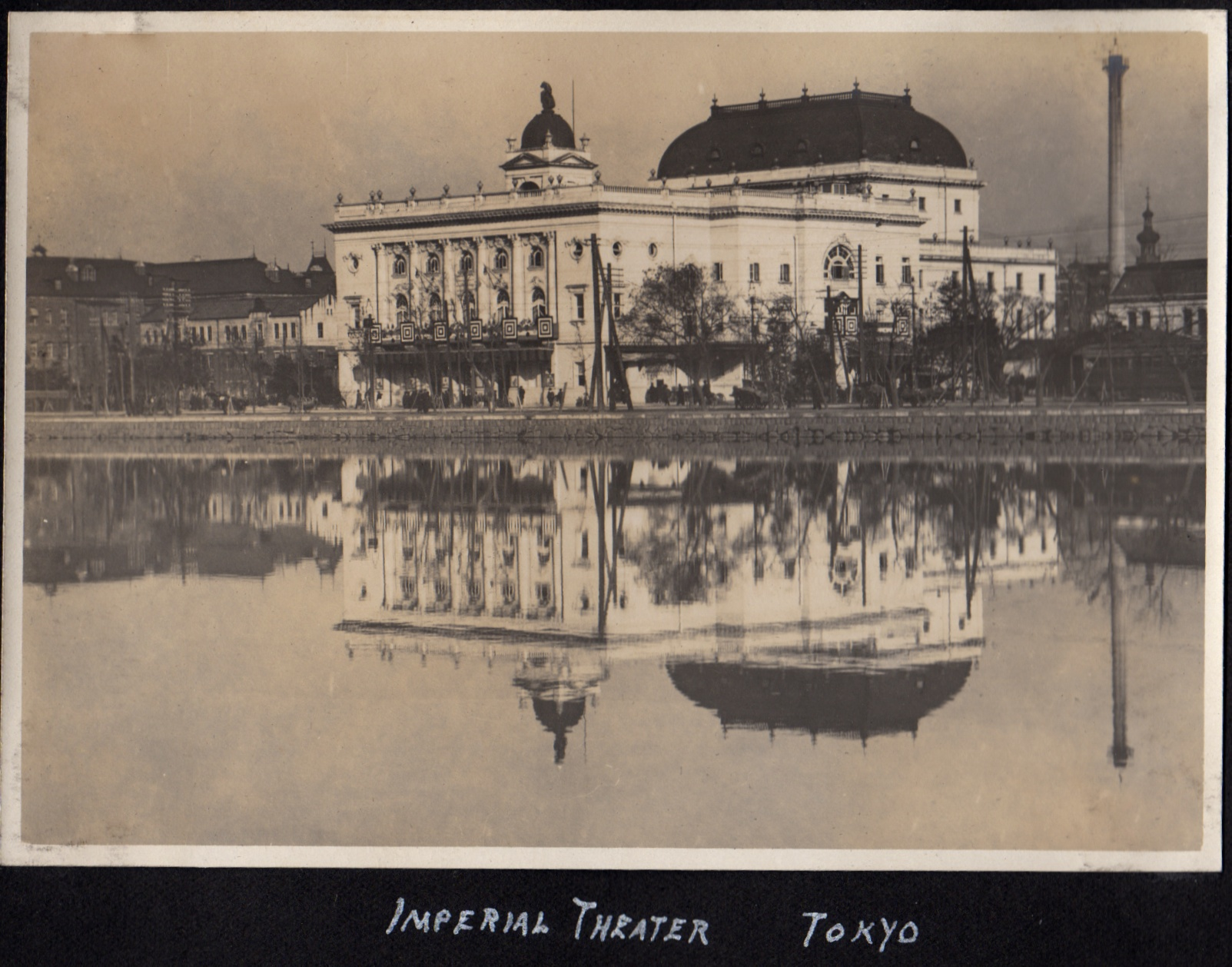
The original Imperial Theatre building, 1915

Opened on March 11, 1911, as the first Western-style theater in Japan, it stages a varied program of musicals and operas. The original structure was rebuilt in 1966 as Toho's "flagship" theater, opening with the premiere of Scaretto, a local adaptation of Gone with the Wind, which drew 380,000 attendees over the course of the theater's first five months of operation.

The theatre is set to temporarily close in mid-February 2025 as part of a redevelopment plan that will involve reconstructing the building.

Preceded by Shibuya Public Hall	Host of the Japan Record Awards; 1969-1984	Succeeded by Nippon Budokan
