= Takuo Yuasa =

Japanese conductor (born 1949)

Takuo Yuasa (湯浅 卓雄, Yuasa Takuo, born 1949) is a Japanese conductor.

== Early life ==
Takuo Yuasa was born in Osaka, Japan, where he studied piano, cello, flute, and clarinet. At age 18, he received a scholarship to study in the US at the University of Cincinnati, eventually completing a bachelor's degree in Theory and Composition.

After graduarion, Yuasa moved to Europe to study conducting at the Hochschule in Vienna with Hans Swarowsky, after which he studied with Igor Markevitch in France and Franco Ferrara in Siena.

== Career ==
Yuaa then became assistant to Lovro von Matačić, working with him in Monte Carlo, Milan, and Vienna. Since winning a Special Award at The Grzegorz Fitelberg International Competition for Conductors in Katowice, Poland, Yuasa has frequently conducted the major orchestras there, including the Warsaw National Philharmonic and the Polish Radio National Symphony Orchestras.

Back in his home of Japan, Yuasa conducts several major Japanese orchestras. In the UK, Yuasa has worked with the London Philharmonic Orchestra, the BBC Scottish Symphony Orchestra and the Ulster Orchestra (as principal guest conductor), the Royal Scottish National Orchestra, Bournemouth Symphony, BBC National Orchestra of Wales, Halle Orchestra, Liverpool Philharmonic amongst others. He has also conducted orchestras throughout Europe and Far East such as; Oslo Philharmonic, Berlin Symphony, Lahti Symphony, Iceland Symphony, National Symphony of Ireland, Royal Flanders Philharmonic, Sydney Symphony, New Zealand Symphony, Hong Kong Philharmonic, Recently Yuasa has appeared with Orchestre National de France, Brussels Philharmonic.
