= Yoshima Kofun =

Kofun period burial mound in Tatsuno, Japan

- 吉島古墳 (Japanese)
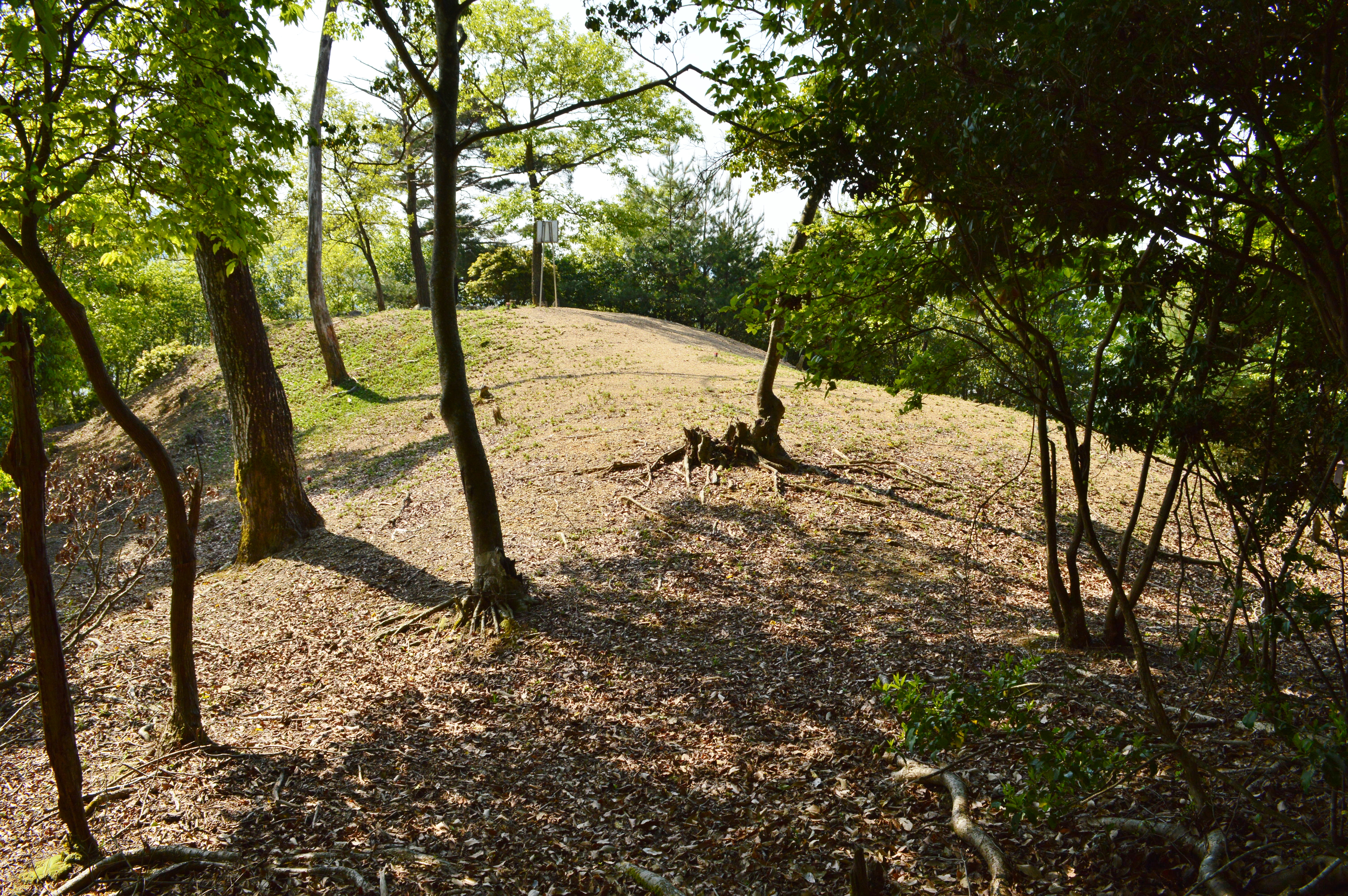
- Yoshima Kofun, posterior circular portion to the left

- Yoshima Kofun Yoshima Kofun (Japan)
- Interactive map of Yoshima Kofun
- 34°56′10.57″N 134°32′45.27″E
- Type: Kofun
- Periods: Kofun period
- Location: Tatsuno, Hyōgo, Japan
- Region: Kansai region

History
- Built: late 3rd century AD

Site notes
- Public access: Yes

The Yoshima Kofun (吉島古墳), also known as the Yoshima Matsuyama Kofun (吉島松山古墳) is a kofun burial mound located in the Shingū neighborhood of the city of Tatsuno, Hyōgo Prefecture, in the Kansai region of Japan. The tumulus was designated a National Historic Site in 1978.

== Overview ==
The Yoshima Kofun is located on a ridge of a steep massif at an elevation of 250 meters above the right bank of the Ibo River. It was first excavated in 1894, details of which were not published by noted archaeologist Sueji Umehara until 1925, and re-excavated and surveyed in 1966. The tumulus is a zenpō-kōen-fun (前方後円墳), which is shaped like a keyhole, having one square end and one circular end, when viewed from above. The tumulus has a length of 36 meters and is asymmetrical, with the posterior circle facing the plain. The anterior end is formed by cutting into the ridge. Neither fukiishi nor haniwa have been found. The burial chamber is a pit-type stone chamber in the center of the posterior circular portion, which intersects the main axis of the mound at an angle. This stone chamber is made of split masonry, measuring about 5.4 meters in length, 0.95 to 1.15 meters in width, and about one meter in height, and traces of a split bamboo-shaped wooden coffin have been detected inside.It is significant in that the grave goods included six small bronze mirrors, with triangular rims and a design of fantastic beasts. Other items included 38 glass balls and one earthenware fragment, and all artifacts are now kept at the Tokyo National Museum. The mirrors were all imported from Han dynasty China. From these items, the construction date of the tumulus is estimated to be around the latter half of the 3rd century at the beginning of the early Kofun period, making it the oldest in the Harima region. The Shingū Miyauchi Site, a large-scale settlement that peaked in the middle of the Yayoi period and another National Historic Site is located nearby.

The nearest train station to the Yoshima Kofun is Harima-Shingū Station on the JR West Kishin Line.

Overall length
36 meters
Posterior circular portion
15 meter diameter
Anterior rectangular portion
6.5 meters wide

== Gallery ==
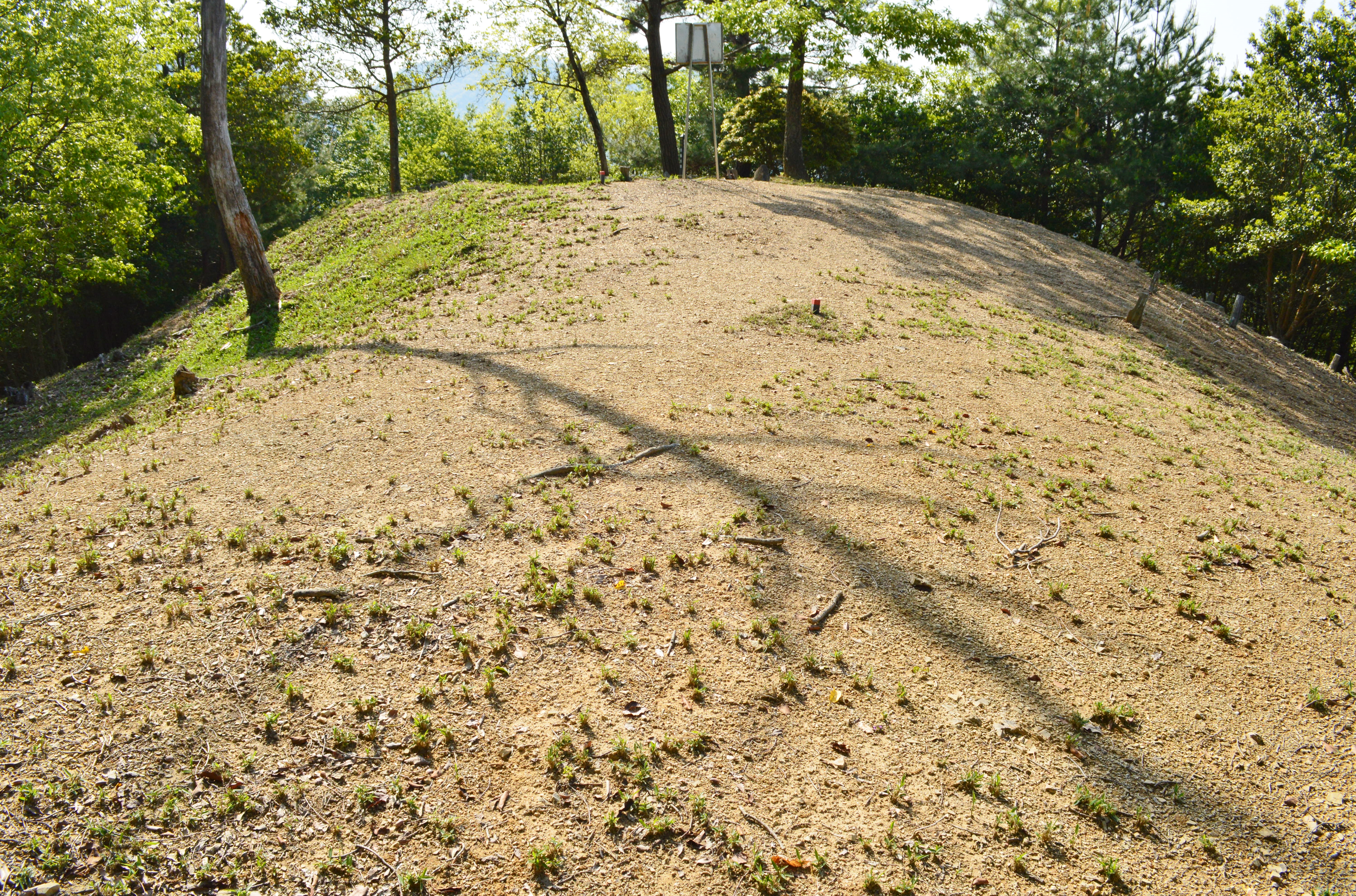
Anterior looks towards PosteriorCircular portion

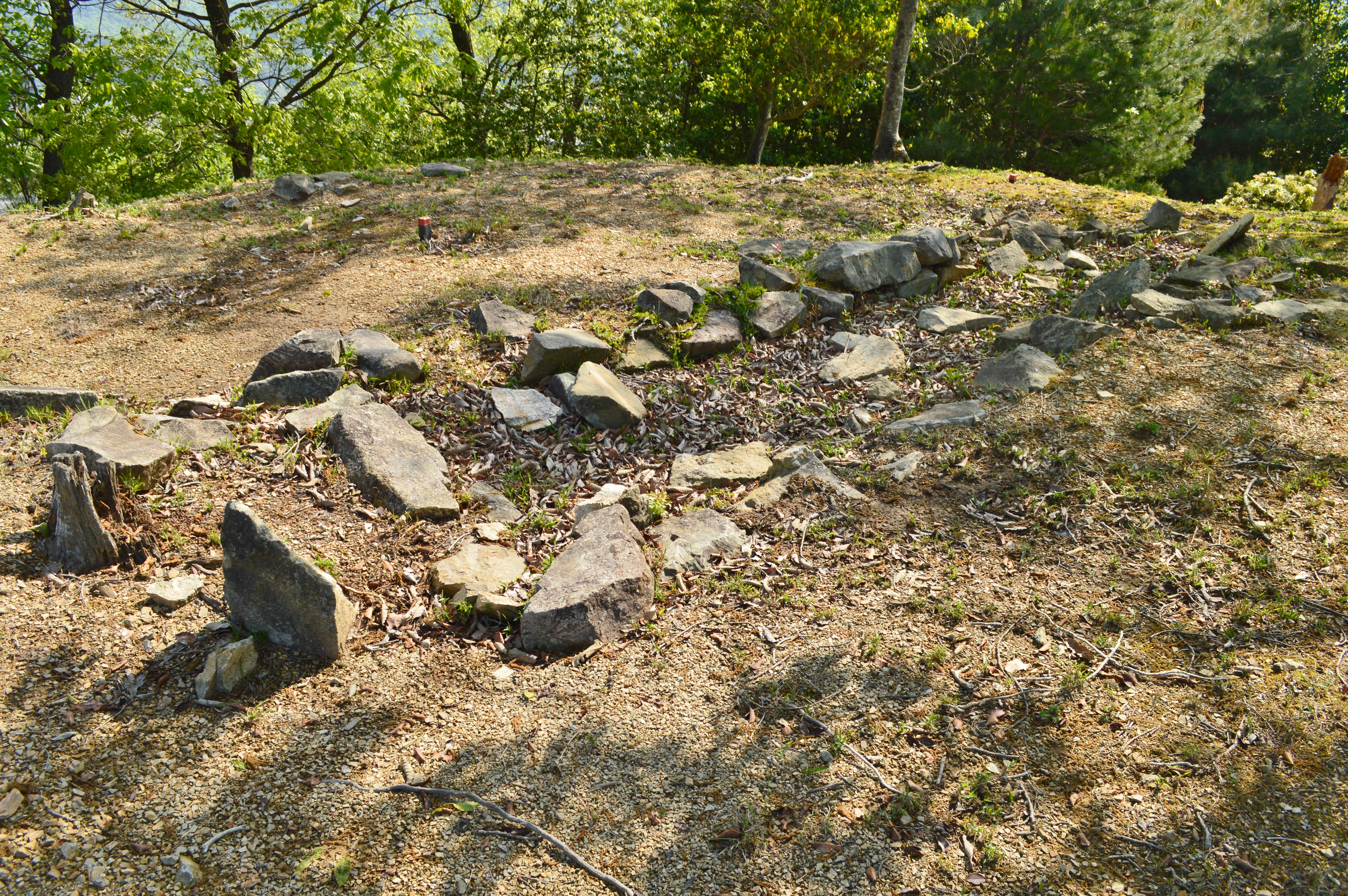
Remains of burial chamber

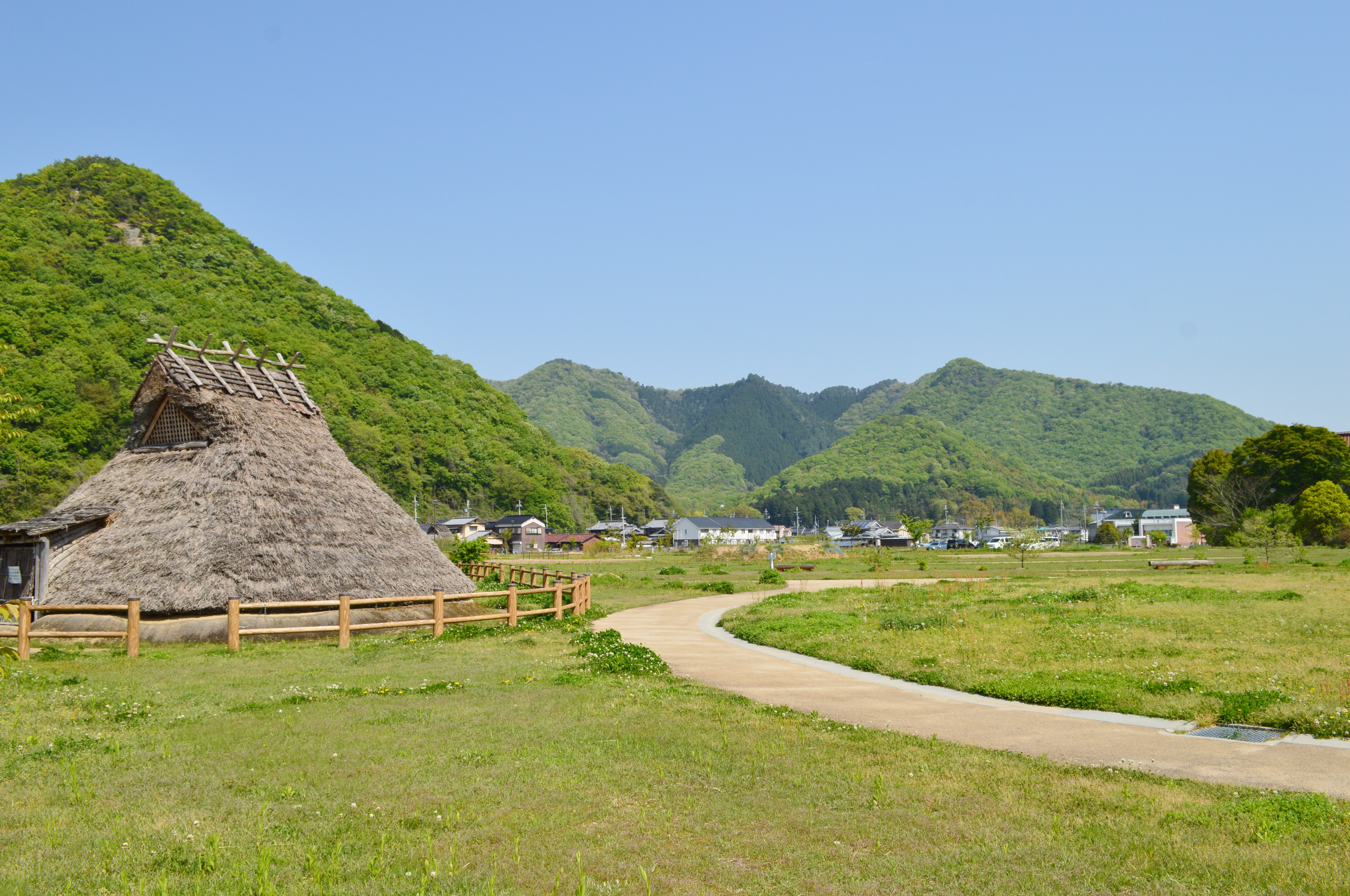
Shingu Miyauchi Ruins, looking towards the Yoshima Kofun

== See also ==
- List of Historic Sites of Japan (Hyōgo)
