= Ibogawa, Hyōgo =

Town in Ibo District, Hyōgo Prefecture, Japan

Ibogawa (揖保川町, Ibogawa-chō) was a town located in Ibo District, Hyōgo Prefecture, Japan.

As of 2003, the town had an estimated population of 12,898 and a density of 545.14 persons per km^{2}. The total area was 23.66 km^{2}.

On October 1, 2005, Ibogawa, along with the towns of Mitsu and Shingū (all from Ibo District), was merged into the expanded city of Tatsuno. The town's name continues to be used as a part of addresses within the former town area.

== Geography ==
The Ibo River runs along the eastern edge of the town.

=== Adjoining municipalities ===
- Tatsuno (as formerly constituted), Aioi, Mitsu (also of Ibo District)

== History ==
- 1951 April 1 – The town is established from the merger of the villages of Handa, Kanbe, Kōchi.
- 1951 August 10 – A small part of the town belonging to the former village of Kanbe (the Nabano section) is transferred to Aioi.
- 2003 April 18 – The city of Tatsuno and the towns of Shingū, Ibogawa, Mitsu, and Taishi form a merger council.
- 2005 October 1 – Ibogawa merges with Tatsuno, Mitsu, and Shingū to form the new city of Tatsuno, with the hiragana form of "Tatsuno" (たつの) being used in the official name. The town of Ibogawa is abolished.

== Leadership ==
- Yagi Katsuyuki (八木 捷之), Ibogawa town mayor

=== Education ===
- Handa Elementary School
- Kanbe Elementary School
- Kōchi Elementary School
- Ibogawa Junior High School

=== Media ===
- K-CAT eoTV (cable television)

== Transportation ==
=== Rail ===
The town is served by Tatsuno Station on JR West's San'yō Main Line.

The San'yō Shinkansen line passes through the center of town.

=== Bus ===
Shinki Bus had service to Tatsuno.

=== Road ===
- San'yō Expressway

The nearest interchanges are Tatsuno IC and Tatsuno West IC, but both are located in the former area of the city of Tatsuno.

- Japan National Route 2
- Hyōgo Prefectural Route 5 Himeji-Kamigōri Route
- Hyōgo Prefectural Route 440 Kuwahara Kitayama-Ibogawa Route
- Hyōgo Prefectural Route 441 Nakashima-Ibogawa Route
- Hyōgo Prefectural Route 442 Iwami-Ibogawa Route
