= Aioi =

Aioi (Japanese: 相生) may refer to:

== Places in Japan ==
- Aioi, Tokushima (相生町 Aioi-chō), the former name of a town in Naka District, Tokushima
- Aioi, Hyōgo (相生市 Aioi-shi)), a city in Hyōgo Prefecture
- Aioi Bridge (相生橋 Aioi hashi), a T-shaped bridge in the center of Hiroshima

== Train stations in Japan ==
- Aioi Station (Gifu), located in Gujō, Gifu Prefecture
- Aioi Station (Gunma), located in Kiryū, Gunma Prefecture
- Aioi Station (Hyōgo), located in Aioi, Hyōgo, Hyōgo Prefecture
- Nishi-Aioi Station, also located in Hyōgo Prefecture
- Sanuki-Aioi Station, located in Higashikagawa, Kagawa Prefecture

== People ==
- Chieko Aioi (相生 千恵子, 1934–2013), Japanese actress and voice actress
- Takahide Aioi (相生 高秀, 1912–1993), fighter pilot in the Imperial Japanese Navy (IJN) who subsequently became a commander of the Japan Maritime Self-Defense Force
- Yoshitaro Aioi (相生 由太郎, 1867–1930) (ja:Yoshitaro Aioi), Japanese entrepreneur who played a significant role in Manchuria during the Meiji, Taisho, and Showa eras

== Other ==
- Yūko Aioi (相生 祐子), a fictional character in the Japanese comedy manga Nichijou
- Aioi Insurance company, a Japanese insurance company
