= Tatsuno Station =

Tatsuno Station is the name of two train stations in Japan:

- Tatsuno Station (Nagano) (辰野駅)
- Tatsuno Station (Hyōgo) (竜野駅)
