= Tatsuno =

Tatsuno たつの市
- City
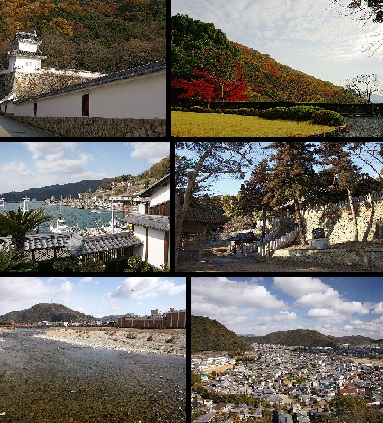
- Top left:Tatsuno Castle, Top right:Tatsuno Park, Middle left:Port of Murotsu, Middle right:iinonimasu Amaterasu Shrine, Bottom left:Ibo River, Bottom right:Panorama view of downtown Tatsuno

- Flag Seal

- Location of Tatsuno in Hyōgo Prefecture

- Location in Japan
- Coordinates: 34°51′03″N 134°32′43″E
- Country: Japan
- Region: Kansai
- Prefecture: Hyōgo

Government
  - Mayor: Masanori Nishida (since November 2005)

Area
  - Total: 210.87 km^{2} (81.42 sq mi)

Population (May 31, 2022)
  - Total: 74,414
  - Density: 352.89/km^{2} (913.98/sq mi)
- Time zone: UTC+09:00 (JST)
- City hall address: Tatsuno-chō Tominaga 1005-1, Tatsuno-shi, Hyōgo-ken 679-4192
- Website: Official website
- Symbols
- Flower: Cherry blossom
- Tree: Prunus mume

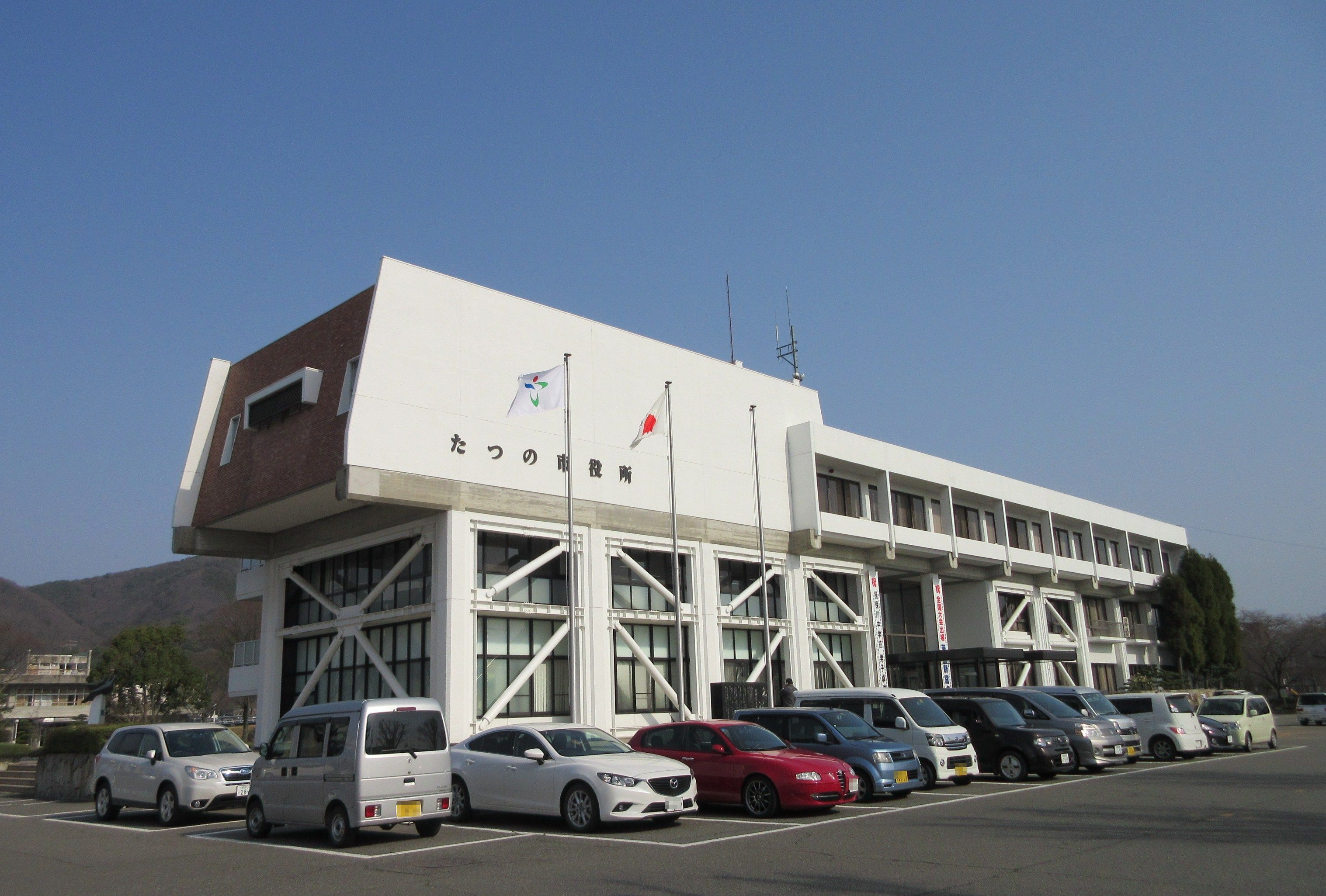
Tatsuno CIty Hall

Tatsuno (たつの市, Tatsuno-shi) is a city in Hyōgo Prefecture, Japan. As of 31 May 2022, the city had an estimated population of 74,414 in 31119 households and a population density of 6200 persons per km^{2}. The total area of the city is 210.87 square kilometres (81.42 sq mi).

The city's name is spelled "たつの", using hiragana, but the name of Tatsuno Station uses the kanji characters "竜野", while the historic name for the place uses the characters "龍野." According to the Harima no Kuni Fudoki, the origin of the name "Tatsuno" was that upon the death of Nomi no Sukune in Ibo District (now in the city of Tatsuno), many came from Izumo and used rock from the Ibo River to make a grave, standing stones in a row on the plain. Thus, it was called "立野", with characters meaning "stand" and "plain", from which it is thought to have changed to "龍野". Nomi no Sukune Shrine is located at the place said to be his grave.

== Geography ==
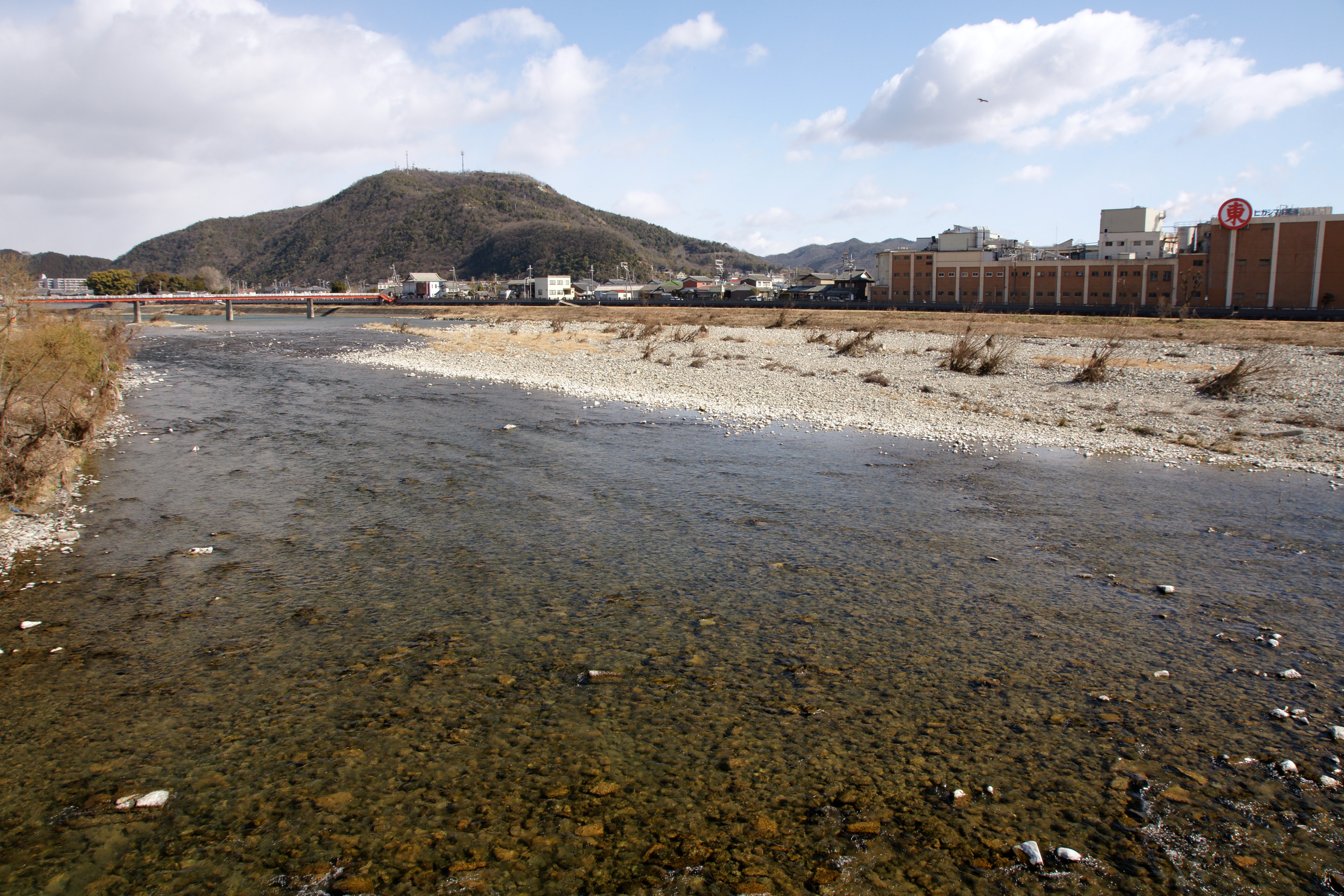
The Ibo River (from Tatsuno Bridge). On the right is the headquarters and Factory No. 1 for Higashimaru Shoyu Co., Ltd. (soy sauce).

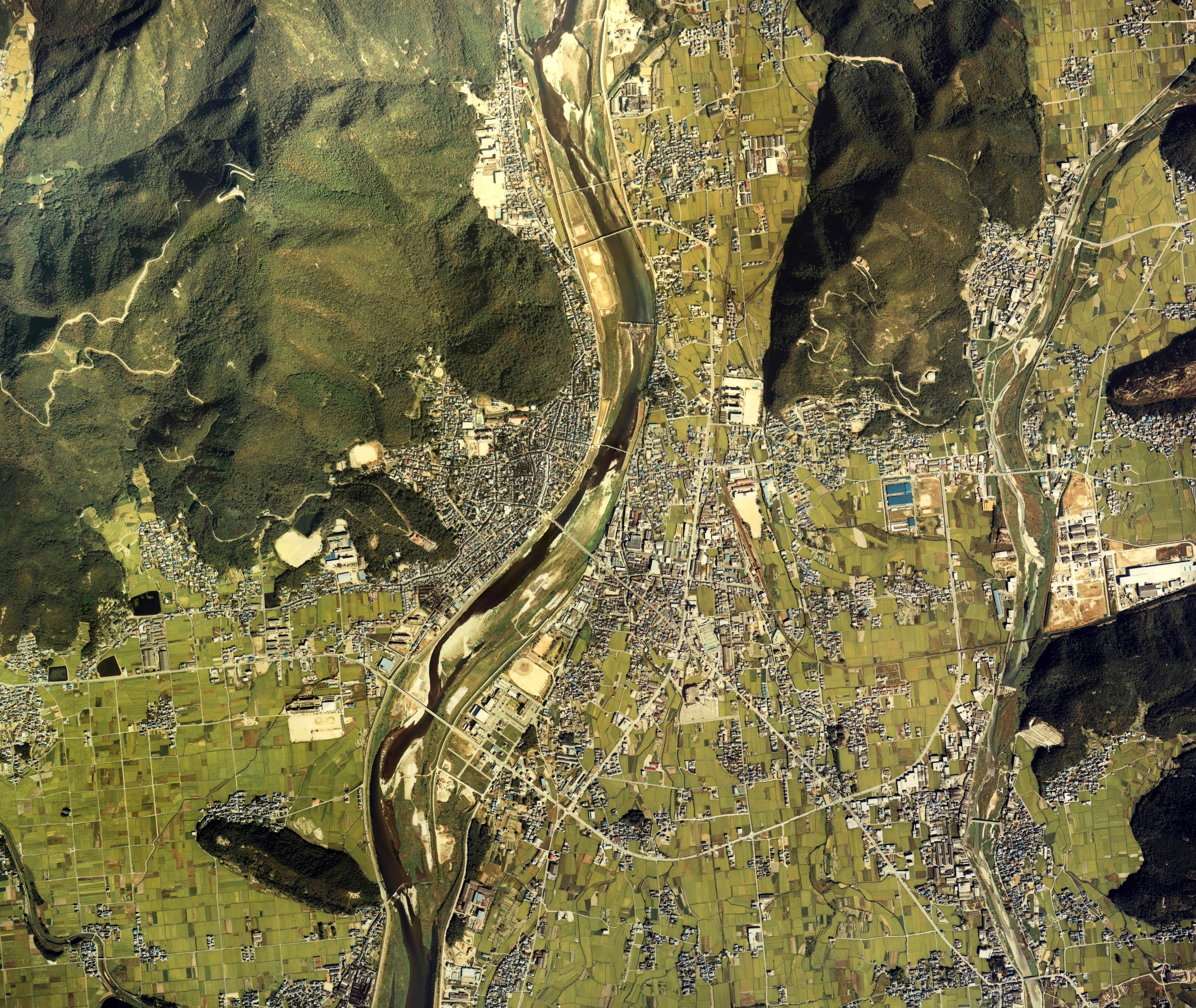
An aerial photo of central Tatsuno and environs. Composed from eight photos taken in 1980. Created from the "Color Aerial Photographs" produced by the Ministry of Land, Infrastructure, Transport and Tourism.

Tatsuno is located in southwestern Hyōgo Prefecture extending largely south to north. The city's northern region is mountainous, the southern region faces the Seto Inland Sea, and the Ibo River runs through from north to south.

- Mountains: Mt. Ayabe (in Mitsu-chō)
- Rivers: Ibo River, Kurisu River
- Passes and Hills: Aisaka Pass (Japan National Route 179), Futagi Pass (Prefectural Route 5), Azawara Pass, Iwami Pass
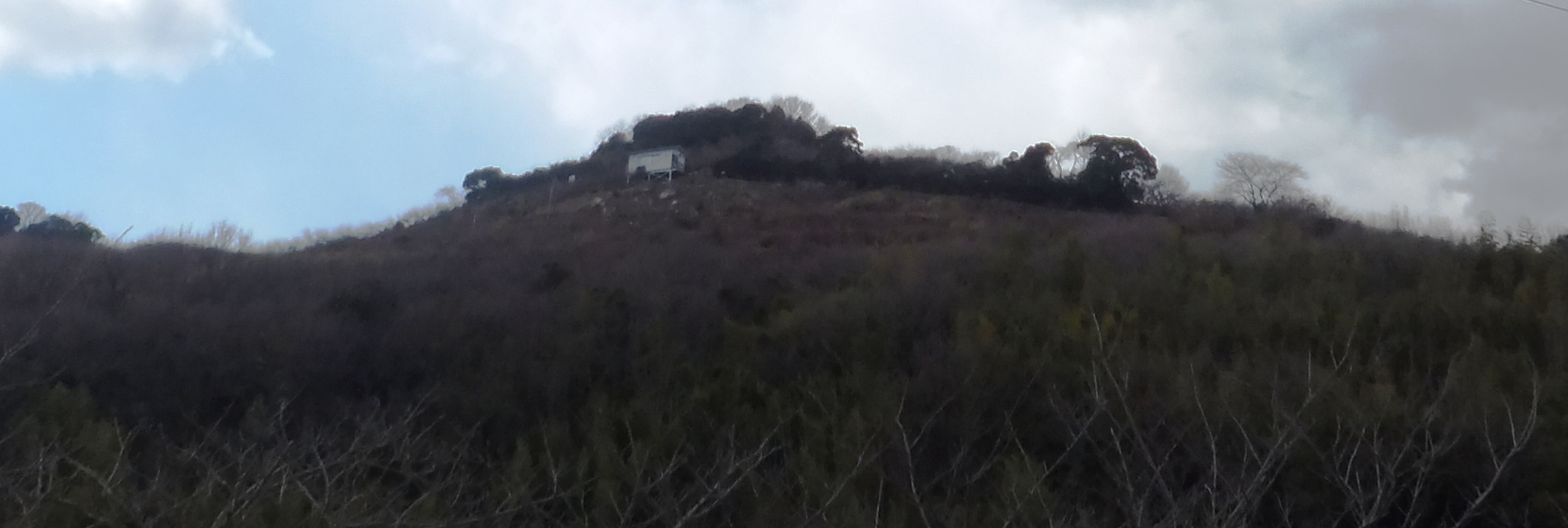
Mt. Ayabe

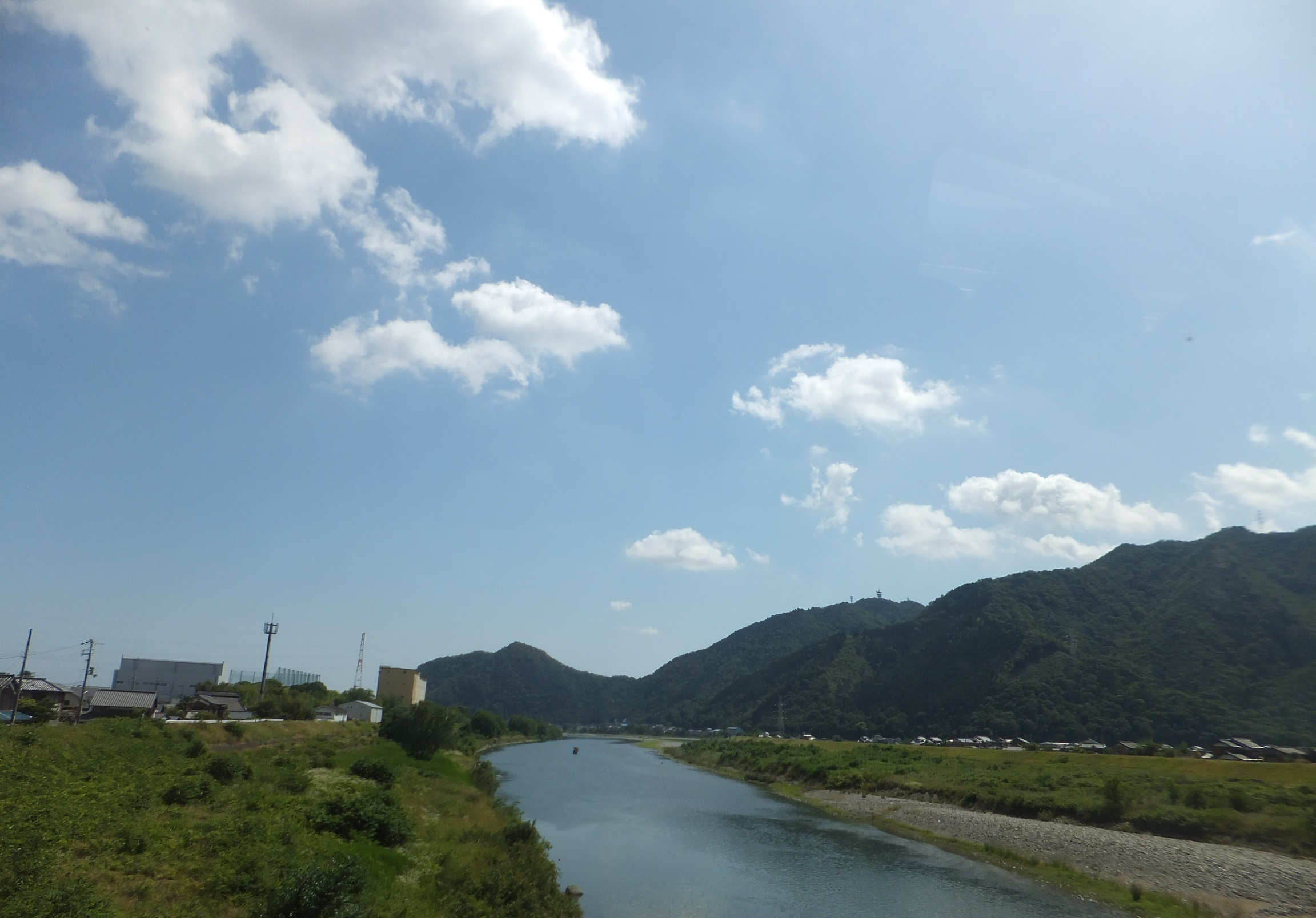
Ibo River
Taken at Hashisaki, Shingū-chō

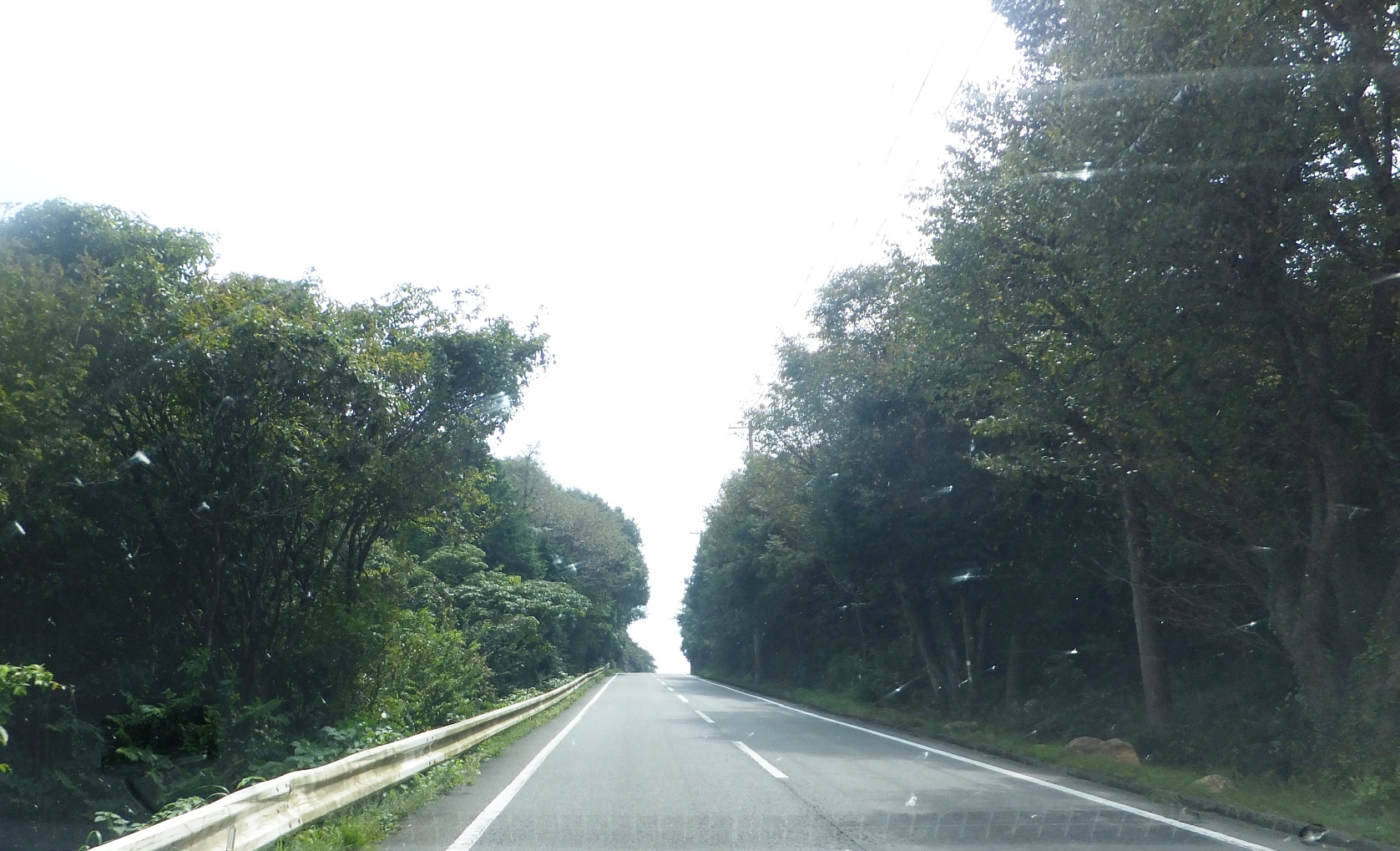
Iwami Hill

=== Neighboring municipalities ===
- North: Shisō; Sayō, Sayō District
- West: Aioi; Kamigōri, Akō District
- East: Himeji; Taishi, Ibo District
- South: Himeji (Ieshima Islands)

=== Climate ===
Tatsuno has a humid subtropical climate (Köppen Cfa) characterized by warm summers and cool winters with light to no snowfall. The average annual temperature in Tatsuno is 14.4 °C. The average annual rainfall is 1519 mm with September as the wettest month. The temperatures are highest on average in August, at around 25.7 °C, and lowest in January, at around 3.7 °C.

== Demographics ==
Per Japanese census data, the population of Tatsuno has remained relatively constant over the past 40 years.

Historical population
Year	Pop.	±%
1950	72,414	—
1960	70,720	−2.3%
1970	73,058	+3.3%
1980	81,167	+11.1%
1990	83,045	+2.3%
2000	83,207	+0.2%
2010	80,541	−3.2%

== History ==
The Tatsuno area was part of ancient Harima Province and was an important location for traffic on the Izumo Kaidō highway running along the Ibo River, and was the location of Kinoyama Castle, a stronghold of the Akamatsu clan in the Muromachi period. After Oda Nobunaga gained supremacy during the Sengoku period, the area became the territory of the Ikeda clan, who ruled Himeji Domain in the early Edo period. Following Ikeda Toshitaka's death, his lands were divided by the Tokugawa shogunate and Honda Masatomo, was installed as daimyō of the newly created Tatsuno Domain. The town prospered as a castle town and the domain passed through various rulers, ultimately coming under the rule of the Wakisaka clan beginning in 1672, lasting 200 years and 10 generations, after which came the Meiji Restoration. The castle town's area from the early modern period is extant today in what is now the "old Tatsuno-chō area,” which still contains samurai residences and white-plastered earthen storehouses, giving the city the moniker of"Little Kyoto of Harima".

The town of Tatsuno was established with the creation of the modern municipalities system on April 1, 1889. On October 1, 2005, the towns of Ibogawa, Mitsu and Shingū (all from Ibo District) were merged into Tatsuno. To reflect the new character of the city, the kanji characters in the city's name were changed from 龍野市^{?} to たつの市^{?}.

== Government ==
Tatsuno has a mayor-council form of government with a directly elected mayor and a unicameral city council of 22 members. Tatsuno, together with the town of Taishi, contributes one member to the Hyogo Prefectural Assembly. In terms of national politics, the city is part of Hyōgo 12th district of the lower house of the Diet of Japan.

== Economy ==
Tatsuno has traditionally been famous for production of sōmen and soy sauce in Japan. However, much of the city is rural, with rice farming and commercial fishing playing roles in the economy. The city is increasing becoming a bedroom community, with 25.0% of those commuting to work go to Himeji (2010 National Census).

== Education ==
Tatsuno has 16 public elementary schools and five public middle schools operated by the city government and two public high schools operated by the Hyōgo Prefectural Department of Education. There is also one private elementary school and one private middle school. The prefecture also operates two special education schools for the handicapped.

== Transportation ==
=== Railway ===
JR West – San'yō Main Line

- Tatsuno

JR West – Kishin Line

- Hon-Tatsuno - Higashi-Hashisaki - Harima-Shingū - Sembon - Nishi-Kurisu

=== Highways ===
- San'yō Expressway
- Harima Expressway
- National Route 2
- National Route 29
- National Route 179
- National Route 250

== Sister cities ==
- Covington, Washington, United States, sister city since 2015
- Te Kūiti, Waitomo, Aotearoa, New Zealand, sister city since 1995

== Local attractions ==
- Shingū Miyauchi Site, National Historic Site
- Tatsuno Castle and surrounding Important Preservation District for Traditional Buildings
- Yoshima Kofun, National Historic Site

== Notable people from Tatsuno ==
- Akira Hori, author
- Kazuya Maruyama, politician
- Rofū Miki, composer of the folk melody "Akatombo" (The red dragonfly)
- Shizuichi Tanaka, Imperial Japanese Army general and Japanese Military Governor of the Philippines during World War II
- Fumito Ueda, director of Ico and Shadow of the Colossus
