= Aboshi =

Aboshi may refer to:

- Aboshi Station, a train station in Himeji, Hyōgo Prefecture, Japan
- Aboshi Line, an 8.5 km Sanyo Electric Railway line within Himeji, Hyōgo Prefecture, Japan
