= Taishi, Hyōgo =

Taishi 太子町
- Town
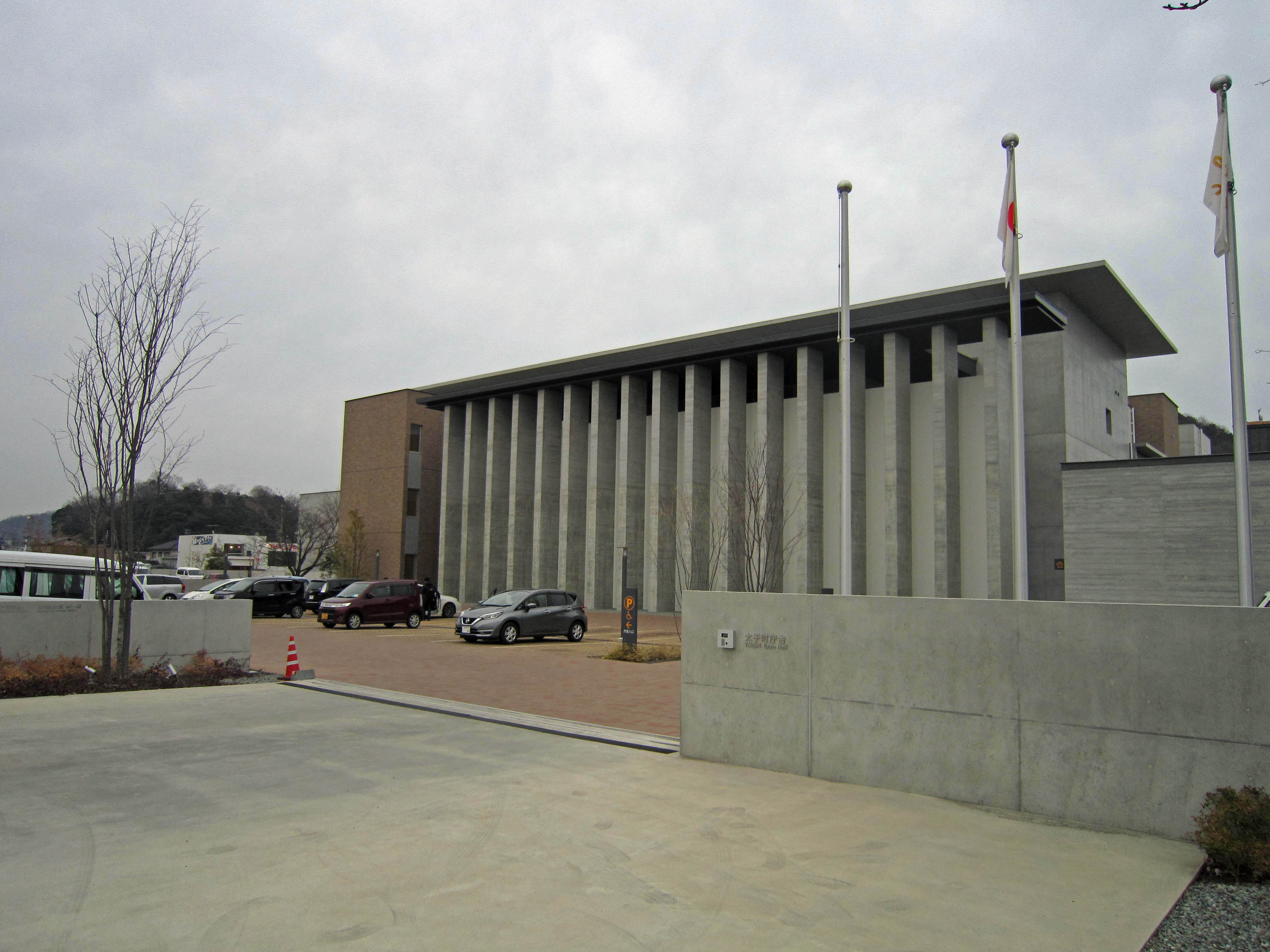
- Taishi Town Hall

- Flag Chapter

- Location of Taishi in Hyōgo Prefecture

- Location in Japan
- Coordinates: 34°50′N 134°34′E
- Country: Japan
- Region: Kansai
- Prefecture: Hyōgo
- District: Ibo

Area
  - Total: 22.61 km^{2} (8.73 sq mi)

Population (June 1, 2022)
  - Total: 33,753
  - Density: 1,493/km^{2} (3,866/sq mi)
- Time zone: UTC+09:00 (JST)
- City hall address: 280-1 Ikaruga, Taishi-chō, Ibo-gun, Hyōgo-ken 671-1592
- Website: Official website
- Symbols
- Flower: Sunflower
- Tree: Sasanqua

Three-storied pagoda, located on the grounds of Ikaruga Temple.

Taishi (太子町, Taishi-chō) is a town located in Ibo District, Hyōgo Prefecture, Japan. As of 31 June 2022, the town had an estimated population of 33,753 in 13941 households and a population density of 1500 persons per km^{2}. The total area of the town is 22.61 square kilometres (8.73 sq mi).

== Geography ==
Taishi is located in southwestern Hyōgo prefecture, and is enveloped to the west by the city of Tatsuno, and to the east by the city of Himeji.

=== Neighboring municipalities ===
Hyōgo Prefecture

- Himeji
- Tatsuno

=== Natural features ===
- Dantoku Hill (Dantoku Yama)
- Ōtsumo River
- Tatsuoka Hill (also known as Tatsuoka Yama)

=== Climate ===
Taishi has a Humid subtropical climate (Köppen Cfa) characterized by warm summers and cool winters with light to no snowfall. The average annual temperature in Taishi is 15.0 °C. The average annual rainfall is 1519 mm with September as the wettest month. The temperatures are highest on average in August, at around 21.6 °C, and lowest in January, at around 4.6 °C.

== Demographics ==
Per Japanese census data, the population of Taishi has steadily increased over the 100 years.

Historical population
Year	Pop.	±%
1920	9,271	—
1930	9,392	+1.3%
1940	9,832	+4.7%
1950	13,599	+38.3%
1960	14,296	+5.1%
1970	20,457	+43.1%
1980	26,686	+30.4%
1990	30,477	+14.2%
2000	31,960	+4.9%
2010	33,439	+4.6%

== History ==
Taishi is located in ancient Harima Province, and the name appears in the Nara period Nihon Shoki records. In 606 AD, Prince Shōtoku, also known as Shōtoku-taishi, gave a lecture on the Lotus Sutra to the Imperial Court, and was rewarded with the estate of Ikaruga-no-shō, which is located on the present town area.

The village of Ikaruga was created within Ibo District, Hyōgo with the establishment of the modern municipalities system on April 1, 1889. It was raised to town status on April 1, 1931. The villages of Sekkai and Ōda were merged with Ikaruga to form the town Taishi on April 1, 1951. On April 1, 1955, Taishi annexed the village of Tatsuda.

In October 2005 three towns (Ibogawa, Shingū, Mitsu) of Ibo District along with the town of Tatsuno merged into a single city bearing the name of Tatsuno. The merger left Taishi as the sole remaining independent town of the Ibo District. Separate plans have been laid out respectively for the merger Taishi and Tatsuno, or the merger of Taishi and Himeji.

== Government ==
Taishi has a mayor-council form of government with a directly elected mayor and a unicameral town council of 14 members. Taishi, together with the city of Tatsuno, contributes one member to the Hyogo Prefectural Assembly. In terms of national politics, the town is part of Hyōgo 12th district of the lower house of the Diet of Japan.

== Economy ==
Taishi has mostly a rural economy based on agriculture and light manufacturing. Toshiba has a factory for the production of semiconductors and related products.

== Education ==
Taishi has four public elementary schools and two public middle schools operated by the town government and one public high school operated by the Hyōgo Prefectural Department of Education.

== Transportation ==
=== Railway ===
The West Japan Railway Company (JR West) San'yō Shinkansen / San'yō Main Line run through the town, but there is no station. The nearest train station is Aboshi Station in Himeji.

=== Highways ===
- National Route 2
- National Route 29
- National Route 179

== Local attractions ==
=== Cultural and historical landmarks ===
- Ikaruga-dera - A Buddhist temple of the Tendai sect that is connected to Prince Shōtoku and given a construction date of A.D. 606 in historical writings.
- The City Museum of History (民俗資料館, Minzoku Shiryou kan) consists of a historical building arrayed with artifacts dating from 1860 to 1863.
- The D51-345 is a locomotive dating from 1941, manufactured in Yamaguchi and on display near Tatsuoka Hill.

=== Places of cultural interest ===
- Asuka Hall - Built in 1993, a culture and arts center where music and other performances are held. Seats an audience of 800.

== Notable people ==
- Yamada Etai (1895–1994) - Buddhist monk, head of the Tendai sect.
- Miyamoto Musashi (1584–1645) - Influential nobleman known for both swordplay and penmanship; born in Taishi; noted in the collection of writings known as the Harimakagami. The fact is possibly apocryphal as many cities lay claim to his birthplace.
- Yasuda Seifū (1895–1979) - Poet who spearheaded the publication of the Tanka periodical Shiratama; known also for writing the poems Harutori and Tatsuokayama.
- Noguchi Sōichi (1965-) - Astronaut and engineer; attended elementary school in Taishi starting from 3 years of age until completing the 5th grade.
