= Kazuya Maruyama (politician) =

Japanese politician (born 1946)

- 丸山 和也

Member of the House of Councillors
- In office 29 July 2007 – 28 July 2019
- Constituency: National PR

Personal details
- Born: 23 January 1946 (age 80) Shingū, Hyōgo, Japan
- Party: Liberal Democratic
- Education: Waseda University; University of Washington

Kazuya Maruyama (丸山 和也, Maruyama Kazuya; born January 23, 1946) is a Japanese politician of the Liberal Democratic Party, a member of the House of Councillors in the Diet (national legislature).

== Career ==
A native of Hyōgo Prefecture and graduate of Waseda University, he joined the Ministry of Justice in 1970, passing the bar exam in the same year. In 1975, he entered a law school at University of Washington and after graduation worked at a law firm in Los Angeles for three years. Returning to Japan in 1980, he was elected to the House of Councillors for the first time in 2007.
