= Mitsu, Hyōgo =

Dissolved municipality in Hyōgo prefecture, Japan

Mitsu (御津町, Mitsu-chō)

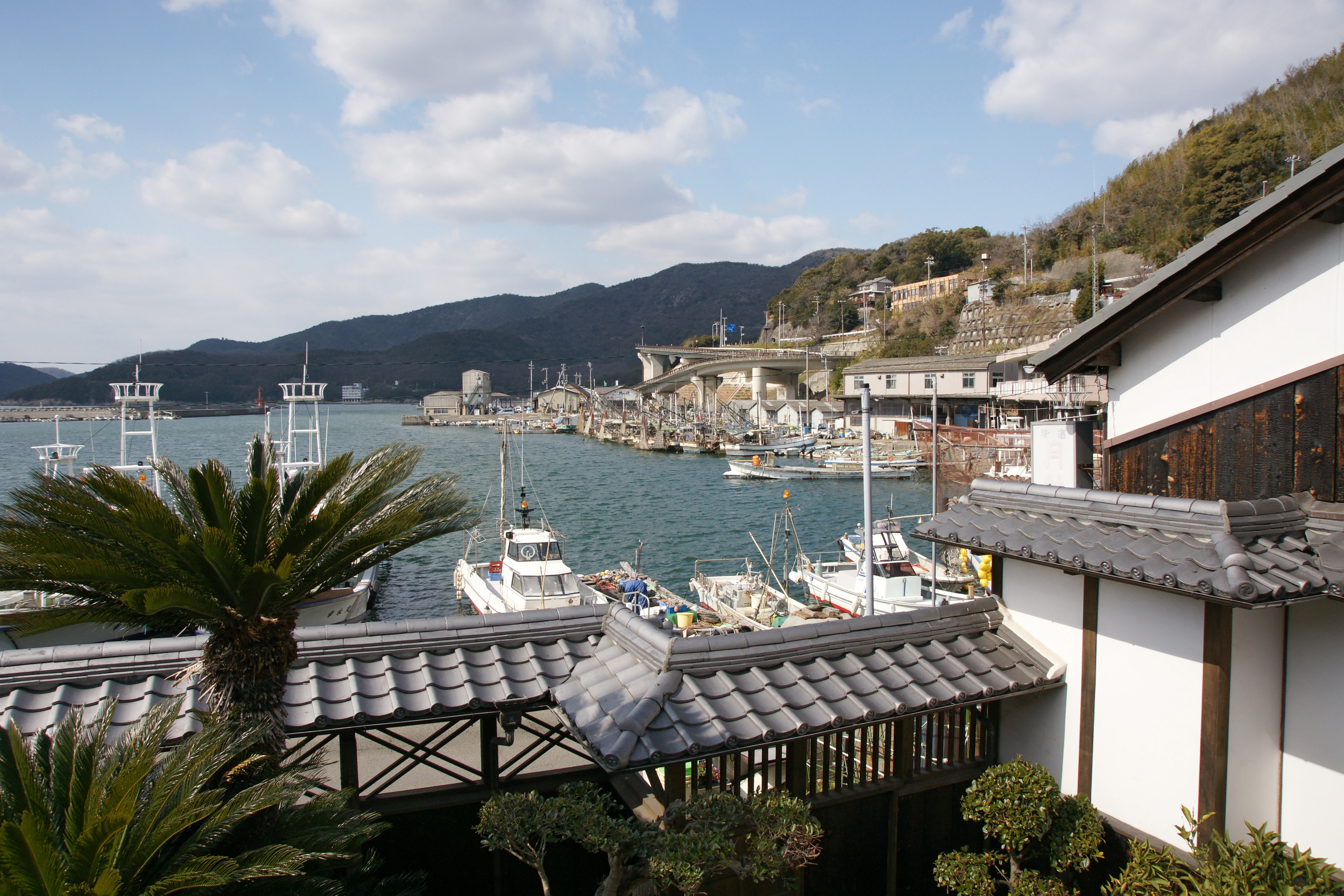

was a town located in Ibo District, Hyōgo Prefecture, Japan.

As of 2003, the town had an estimated population of 11,966 and a density of 665.89 persons per km^{2}. The total area was 17.97 km^{2}.

On October 1, 2005, Mitsu, along with the towns of Ibogawa and Shingū (all from Ibo District), was merged into the expanded city of Tatsuno.
