= Ibo District, Hyōgo =

District in Hyōgo Prefecture, Japan

Coordinates: 34.8387°N 134.5892°E

Ibo district.

Ibo (揖保郡, Ibo-gun) is a district located in Hyōgo Prefecture, Japan.

As of 2020, the district has an estimated population of 34,105. The total area is 22.61 km^{2}.

== Towns and villages ==
- Taishi

== Merger ==
- On October 1, 2005 the towns of Ibogawa, Mitsu and Shingū merged into the expanded city of Tatsuno.
