= Higashi-Hashisaki Station =

Railway station in Tatsuno, Hyōgo Prefecture, Japan

Higashi-Hashisaki Station 東觜崎駅
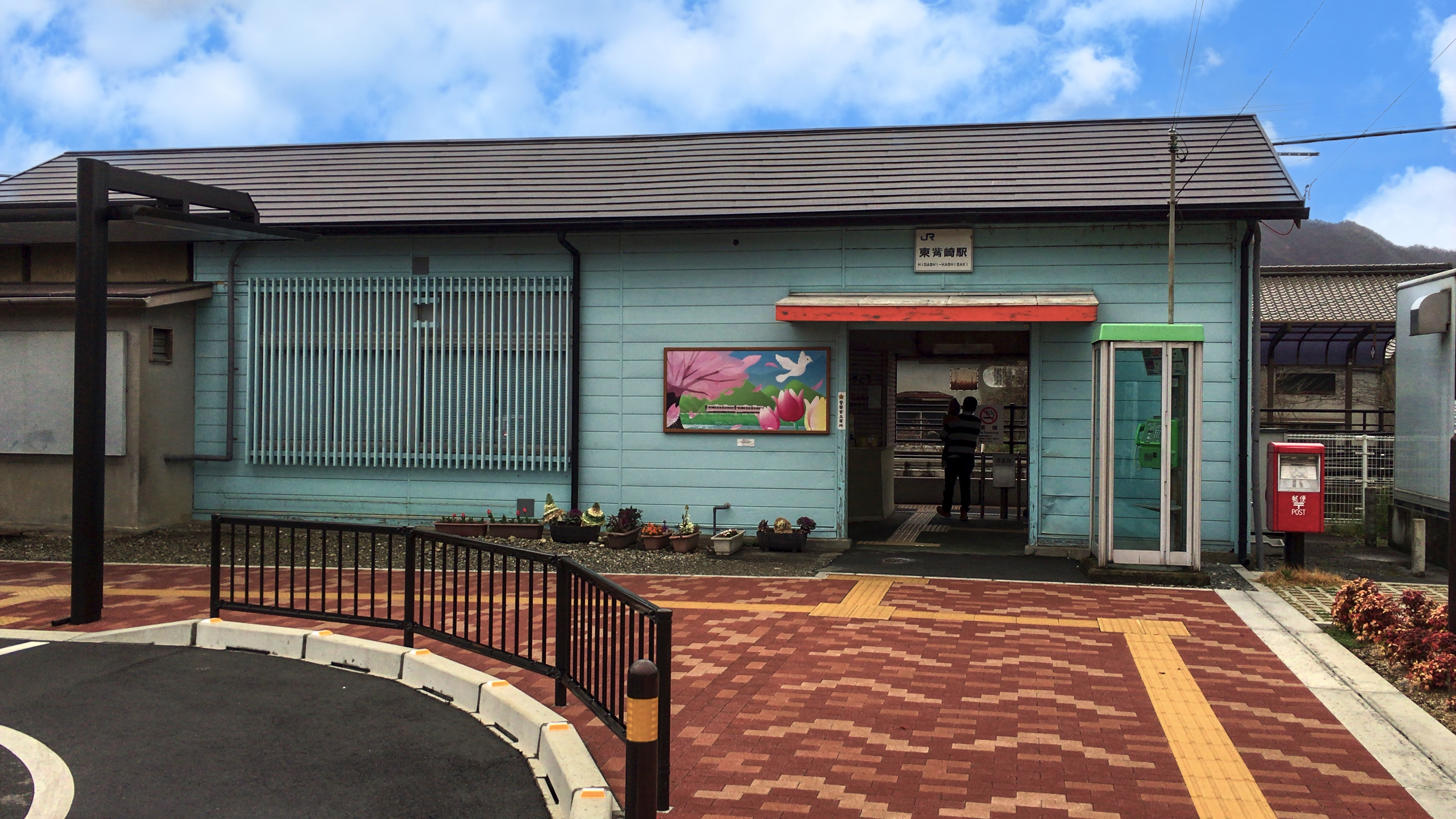
- Higashi-Hashisaki Station, March 2021

General information
- Location: Kamioka-chō Higashihashisaki, Tatsuno-shi, Hyōgo-ken 679-4109; Japan
- Coordinates: 34.8876°N 134.5575°E
- Owner: West Japan Railway Company
- Operator: West Japan Railway Company
- Line: Kishin Line
- Distance: 17.8 km (11.1 miles) from Himeji
- Platforms: 2 side platforms
- Connections: Bus stop

Other information
- Status: Unstaffed
- Website: Official website

History
- Opened: 23 December 1931; 94 years ago

Passengers
- FY2019: 423 daily

Services
Preceding station	JR West	Following station
Harima-Shingū towards Niimi	Kishin Line Local	Hon-Tatsuno towards Himeji
Location
- Location within Hyōgo Prefecture Location within Japan

Higashi-Hashisaki Station (東觜崎駅, Higashi-Hashisaki-eki) is a passenger railway station located in the city of Tatsuno, Hyōgo Prefecture, Japan, operated by West Japan Railway Company (JR West).

== Lines ==
Higashi-Hashisaki Station is served by the Kishin Line, and is located 17.8 kilometers from the terminus of the line at Himeji.

== Station layout ==
The station consists of two opposed ground-level side platforms connected to the station building by a level crossing. The station is unattended.

=== Platforms ===
1	■ Kishin Line	for Himeji
2	■ Kishin Line	for Sayo

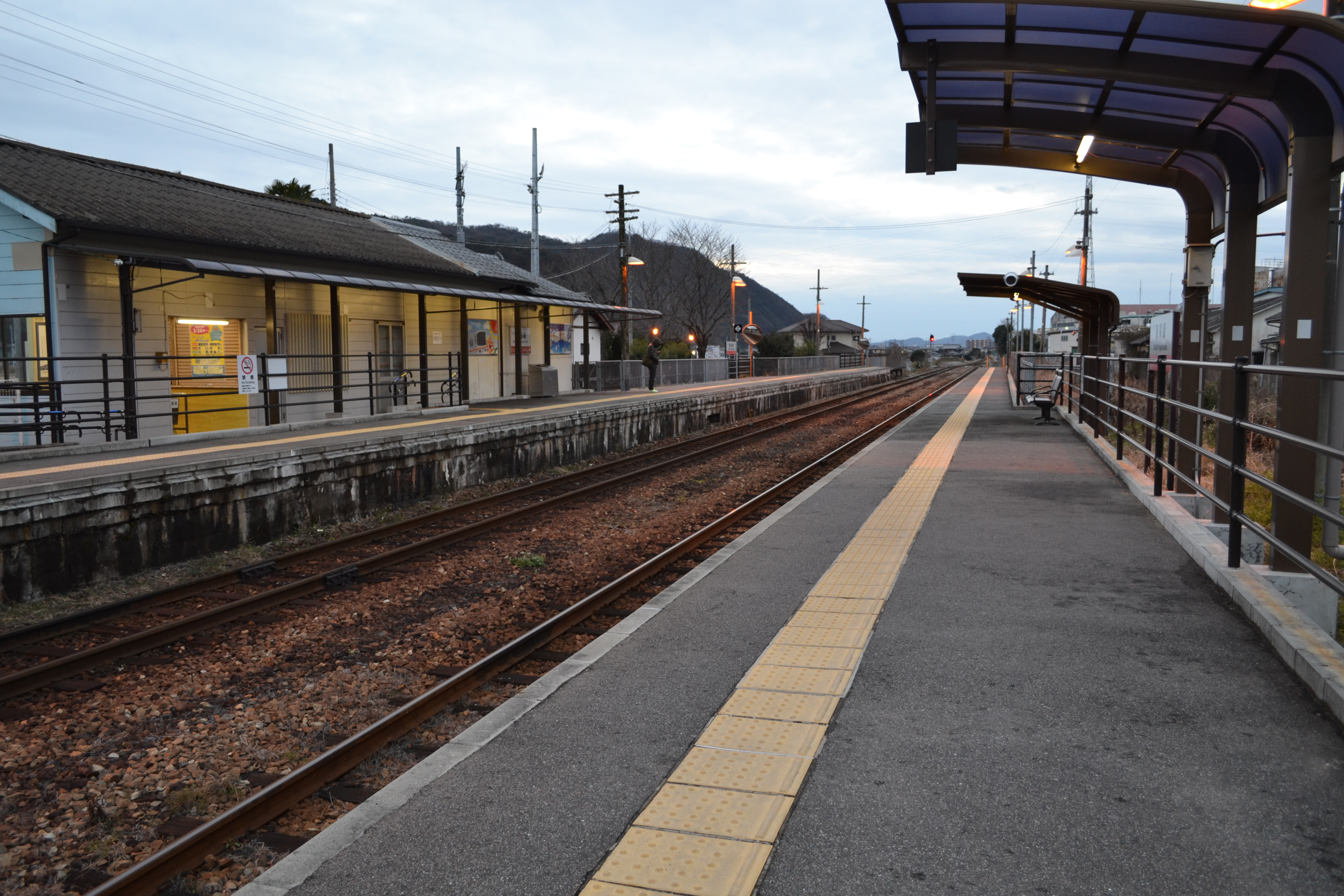
The platforms in January 2016

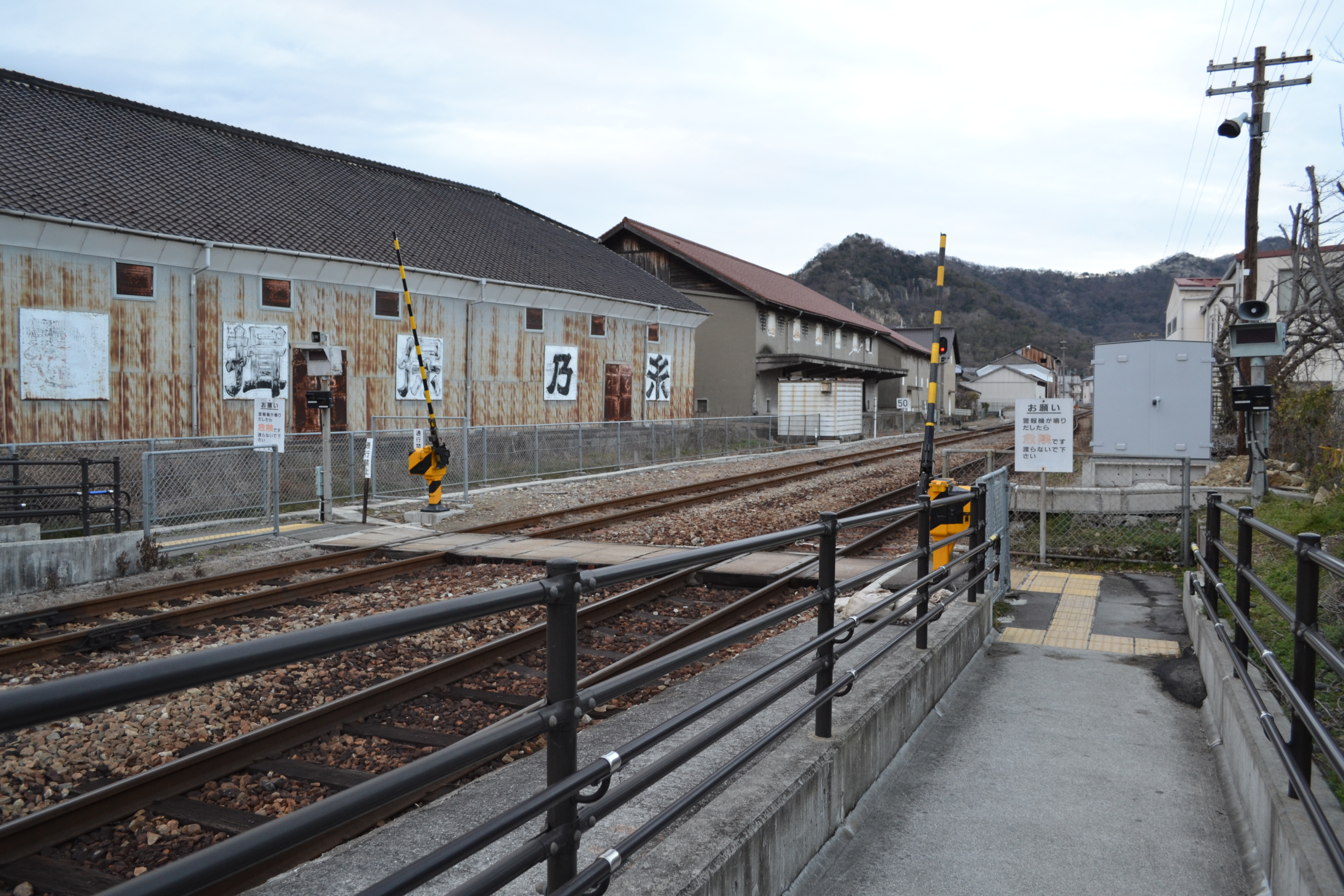
The level crossing linking the platforms in January 2016

== History ==
Higashi-Hashisaki Station opened on 23 December 1931. With the privatization of Japanese National Railways (JNR) on 1 April 1987, the station came under the control of JR West.

== Passenger statistics ==
In fiscal 2019, the station was used by an average of 423 passengers daily.

== Surrounding area ==
- Tenobe Somen Ibo-no-Ito Museum

== See also ==
- List of railway stations in Japan
