= Shingū Miyauchi Site =

Yayoi period settlement trace in Tatsuno, Japan

Coordinates: 34°55′26″N 134°32′46″E

Shingū Miyauchi site
- 新宮宮内遺跡 (Japanese)
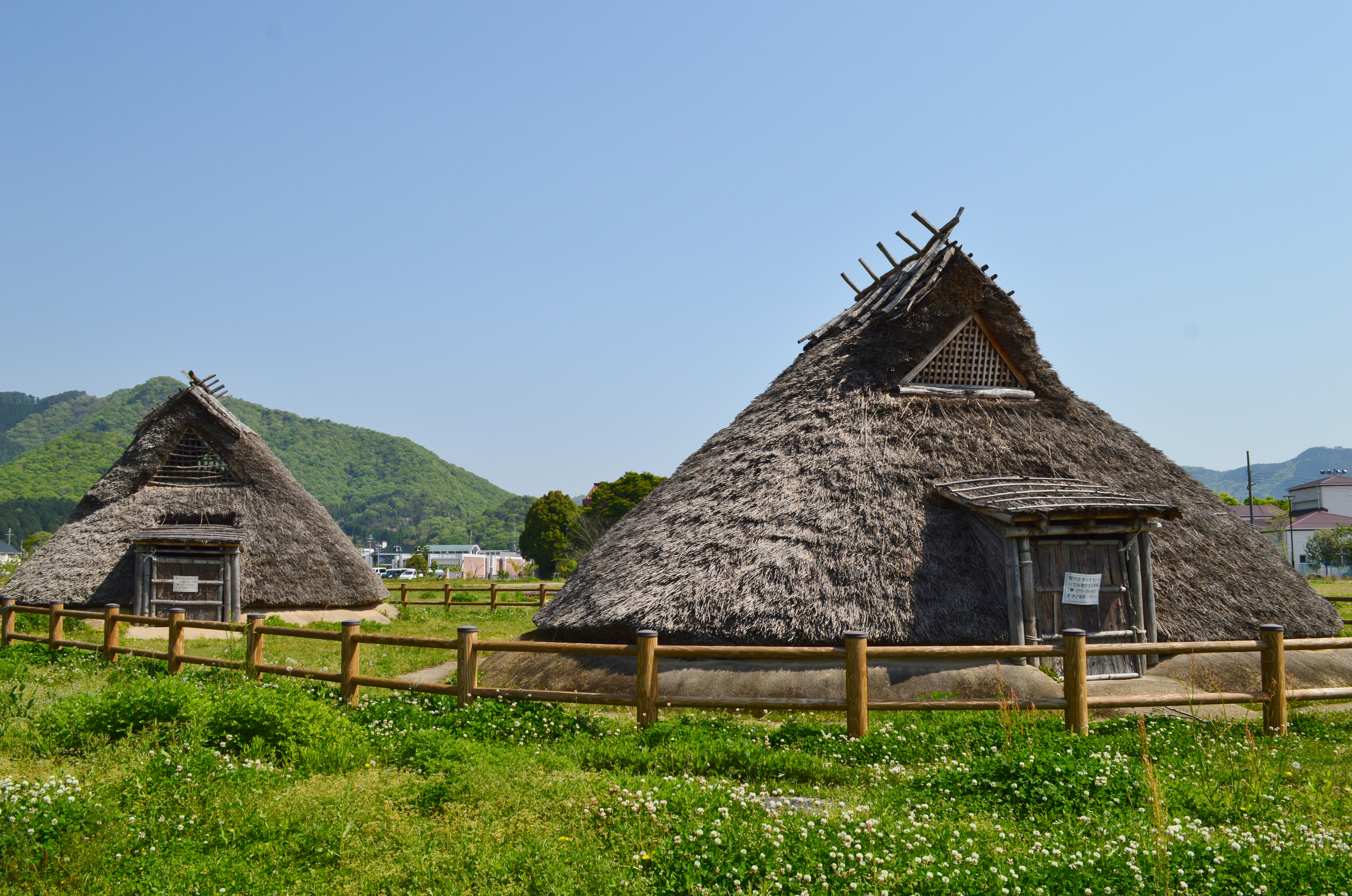
- reconstructed pit dwellings at Shingū Miyauchi site

- Shingū Miyauchi site Shingū Miyauchi Site (Japan)
- Interactive map of Shingū Miyauchi site
- Type: Settlement trace
- Periods: Yayoi period
- Location: Tatsuno, Hyōgo, Japan
- Region: Kansai region

History
- Built: 1st-3rd century AD

Site notes
- Public access: Yes (park and museum)

The Shingū Miyauchi site (新宮宮内遺跡, Shingū Miyauchi iseki) is an archaeological site with the traces of a late Jōmon to Yayoi period settlement located in the Shingū neighborhood of the city of Tatsuno, Hyōgo Prefecture, in the Kansai region of Japan. It was designated a National Historic Site in 1982.

== Overview ==
The Shingū Miyauchi Site is located behind JR West Harima-Shingū Station, in an area which was subject to rapid urban development from around 1965. As a result of preliminary surveys made by rescue archaeology, it was found to be the first lowland Yayoi period archaeological site in the Harima region. Subsequent investigations revealed that the area of the settlement was approximately 400 meters east-to-west by 230 meters north-to-south. The foundations of several pit dwellings were found, which were also a first for the middle basin of the Ibo River. The settlement existed until the mid-Yayoi period, as evidenced by a large amount of Yayoi pottery and a circular burial mound also found at the site. The site has been preserved as an archaeological park with a number of reconstructed pit dwellings. It is located a four-minute walk from Harima-Shingū Station.

== See also ==
- List of Historic Sites of Japan (Hyōgo)
