= Hon-Tatsuno Station =

Railway station in Tatsuno, Hyōgo Prefecture, Japan

Hon-Tatsuno Station 本竜野駅
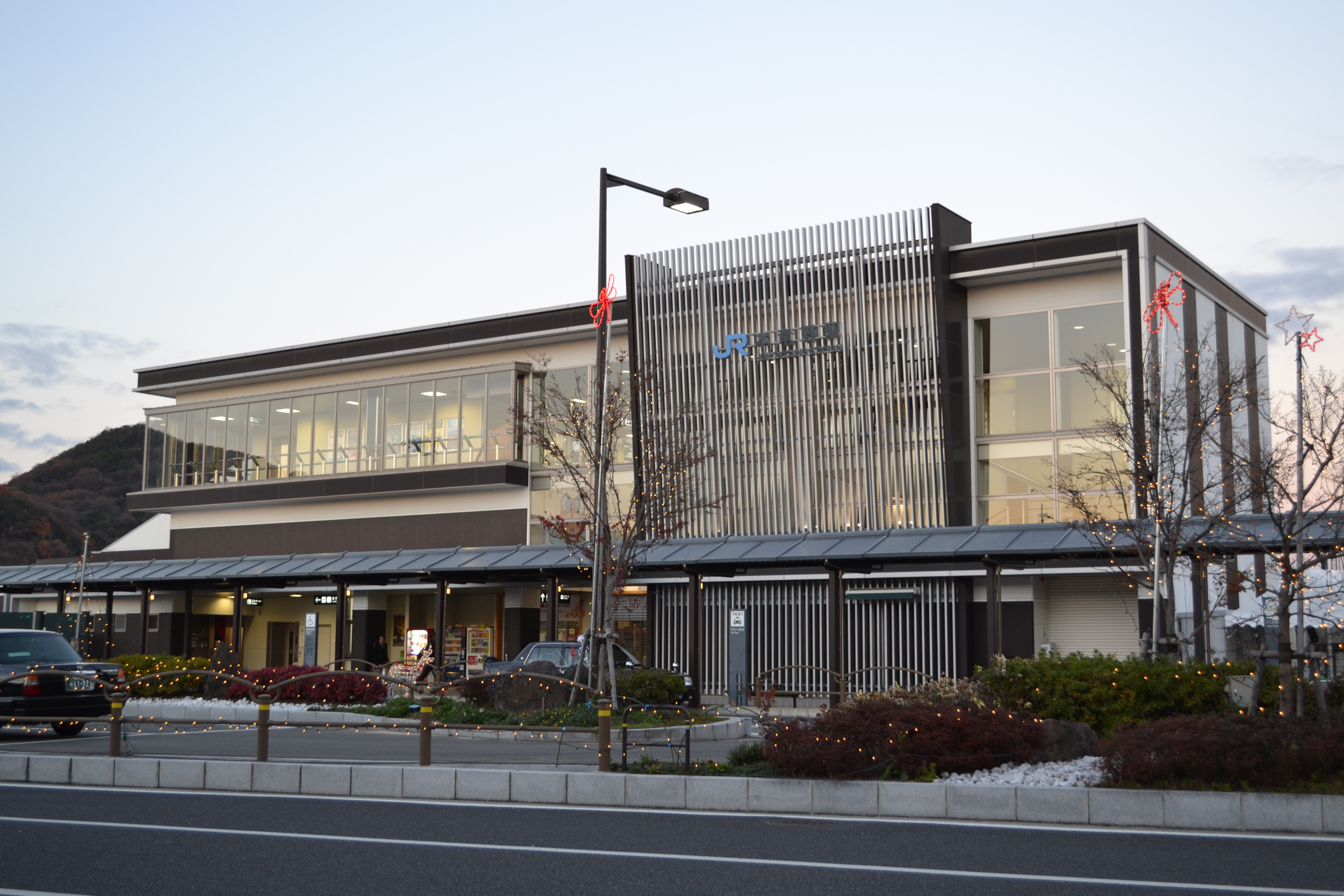
- Hon-Tatsuno Station, December 2015

General information
- Location: Shingu-chō Kajiya, Tatsuno-shi, Hyōgo-ken 679-5154; Japan
- Coordinates: 34.8625°N 134.5551°E
- Owner: West Japan Railway Company
- Operator: West Japan Railway Company
- Line: Kishin Line
- Distance: 14.9 km (9.3 miles) from Himeji
- Platforms: 2 side platforms
- Connections: Bus stop

Construction
- Accessible: Yes

Other information
- Status: Staffed (Midori no Madoguchi)
- Website: Official website

History
- Opened: 23 December 1931; 94 years ago

Passengers
- FY2019: 1945 daily

Services
Preceding station	JR West	Following station
Higashi-Hashisaki towards Niimi	Kishin Line Local	Ōichi towards Himeji
Location
- Location within Hyōgo Prefecture Location within Japan

Hon-Tatsuno Station (本竜野駅, Hon-Tatsuno-eki) is a passenger railway station located in the city of Tatsuno, Hyōgo Prefecture, Japan, operated by West Japan Railway Company (JR West).

== Lines ==
Hon-Tatsuno Station is served by the Kishin Line, and is located 14.9 kilometers from the terminus of the line at Himeji.

== Station layout ==
The station consists of two opposed ground-level side platforms connected by an elevated station building. The station has a Midori no Madoguchi staffed ticket office.

=== Platforms ===
1	■ Kishin Line	for Sayo
2	■ Kishin Line	for Himeji

== History ==
Hon-Tatsuno Station opened on December 23, 1931. With the privatization of the Japan National Railways (JNR) on April 1, 1987, the station came under the aegis of the West Japan Railway Company.

== Passenger statistics ==
In fiscal 2019, the station was used by an average of 1945 passengers daily.

== Surrounding area ==
- Tatsuno Castle
- Tatsuno City History and Culture Museum
- Usukuchi Tatsuno Soy Sauce Museum

== See also ==
- List of railway stations in Japan
