= Ōichi Station =

Railway station in Himeji, Hyōgo Prefecture, Japan

Ōichi Station 太市駅
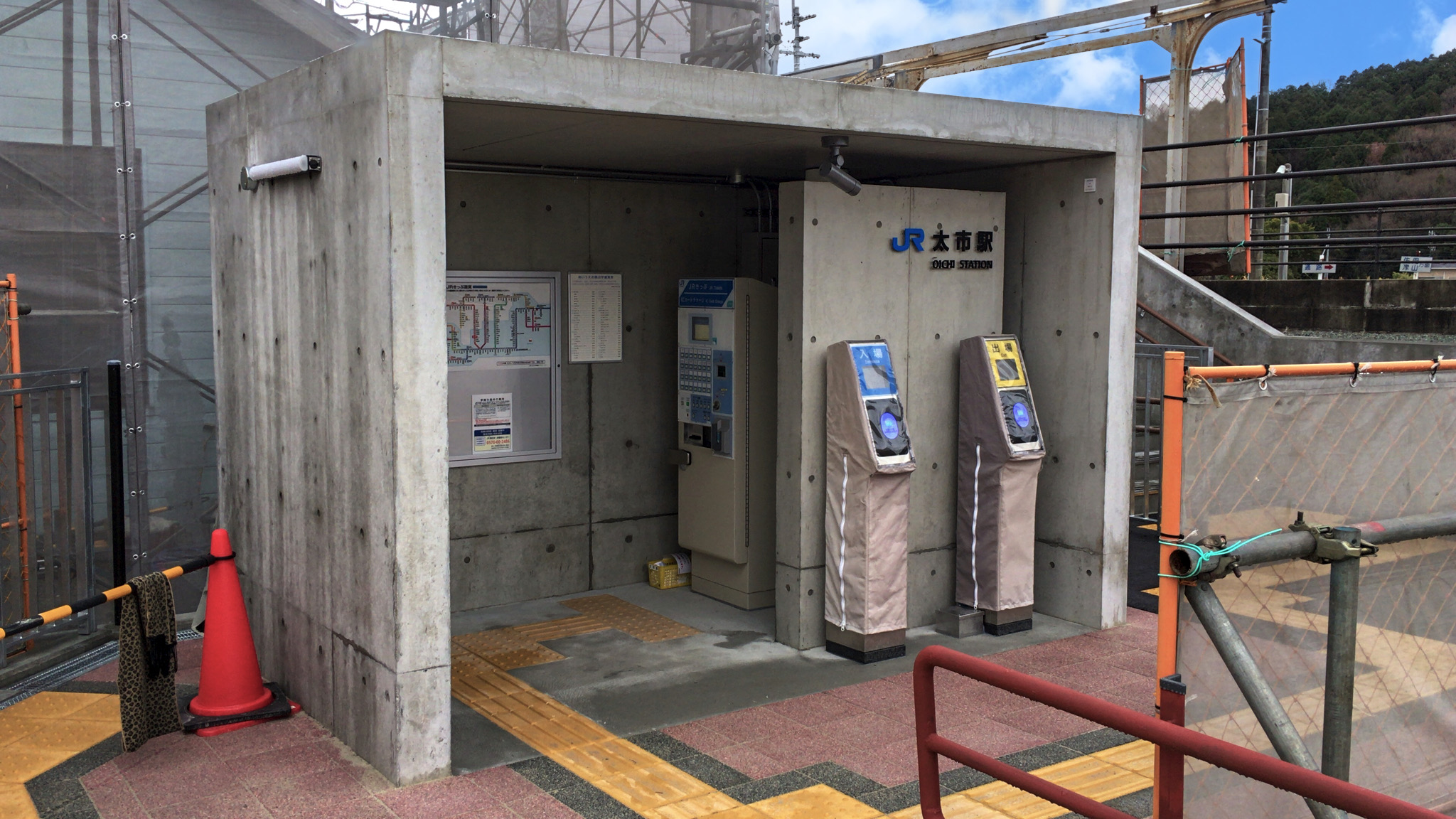
- Ōichi Station in March 2021

General information
- Location: 107 Aino, Himeji-shi, Hyōgo-ken 671-2232; Japan
- Coordinates: 34.8642°N 134.6070°E
- Owner: West Japan Railway Company
- Operator: West Japan Railway Company
- Line: Kishin Line
- Distance: 9.9 km (6.2 miles) from Himeji
- Platforms: 2 side platforms
- Connections: Bus stop

Other information
- Status: Unstaffed
- Website: Official website

History
- Opened: 23 December 1931; 94 years ago

Passengers
- FY2019: 398 daily

Services
Preceding station	JR West	Following station
Hon-Tatsuno towards Niimi	Kishin Line Local	Yobe towards Himeji
Location
- Location within Hyōgo Prefecture Location within Japan

Ōichi Station (太市駅, Ōichi-eki) is a passenger railway station located in the city of Himeji, Hyōgo Prefecture, Japan, operated by West Japan Railway Company (JR West).

== Lines ==
Ōichi Station is served by the Kishin Line, and is located 9.9 kilometers from the terminus of the line at Himeji.

== Station layout ==
The station consists of two ground-level opposed side platforms connected by a level crossing. The station is unattended.

=== Platforms ===
1	■ Kishin Line	for Sayo
2	■ Kishin Line	for Himeji

== History ==
Ōichi Station opened on December 3, 1931. With the privatization of the Japan National Railways (JNR) on April 1, 1987, the station came under the aegis of the West Japan Railway Company.

== Passenger statistics ==
In fiscal 2019, the station was used by an average of 398 passengers daily.

== Surrounding area ==
- Himeji City Oichi Elementary School
- Oichi Post Office
- JA Hyogo Nishita City Branch

== See also ==
- List of railway stations in Japan
