= Sembon Station =

Railway station in Tatsuno, Hyōgo Prefecture, Japan

Sembon Station 千本駅
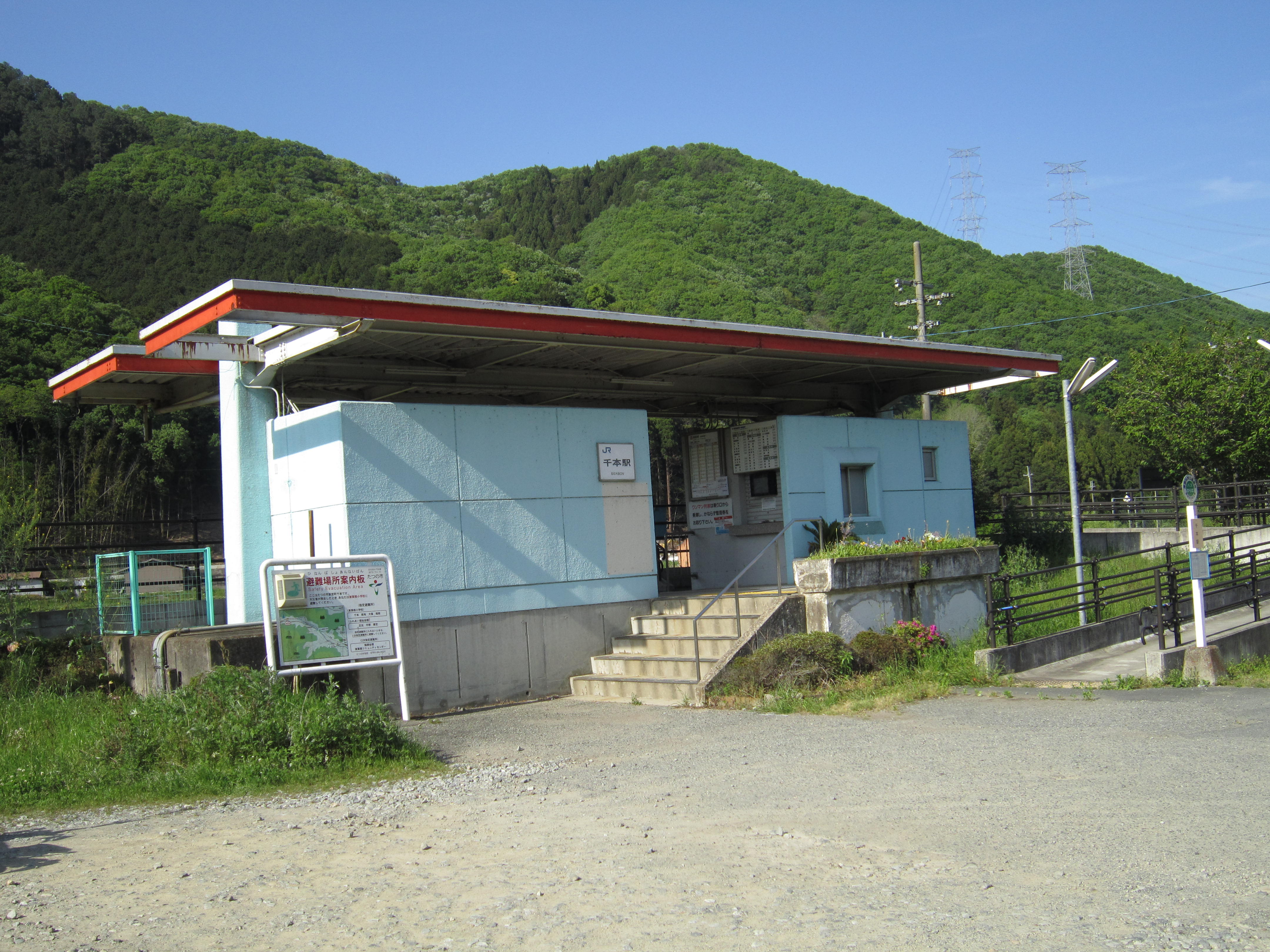
- Senbon Station, May 2019

General information
- Location: Shingu-chō Senbon, Tatsuno-shi, Hyōgo-ken 679-4346; Japan
- Coordinates: 34.9425°N 134.4942°E
- Owner: West Japan Railway Company
- Operator: West Japan Railway Company
- Line: Kishin Line
- Distance: 27.6 km (17.1 miles) from Himeji
- Platforms: 1 side platform
- Connections: Bus stop

Other information
- Status: Unstaffed
- Website: Official website

History
- Opened: 24 March 1934; 92 years ago

Passengers
- FY2019: 31 daily

Services
Preceding station	JR West	Following station
Nishi-Kurisu towards Niimi	Kishin Line Local	Harima-Shingū towards Himeji
Location
- Location within Hyōgo Prefecture Location within Japan

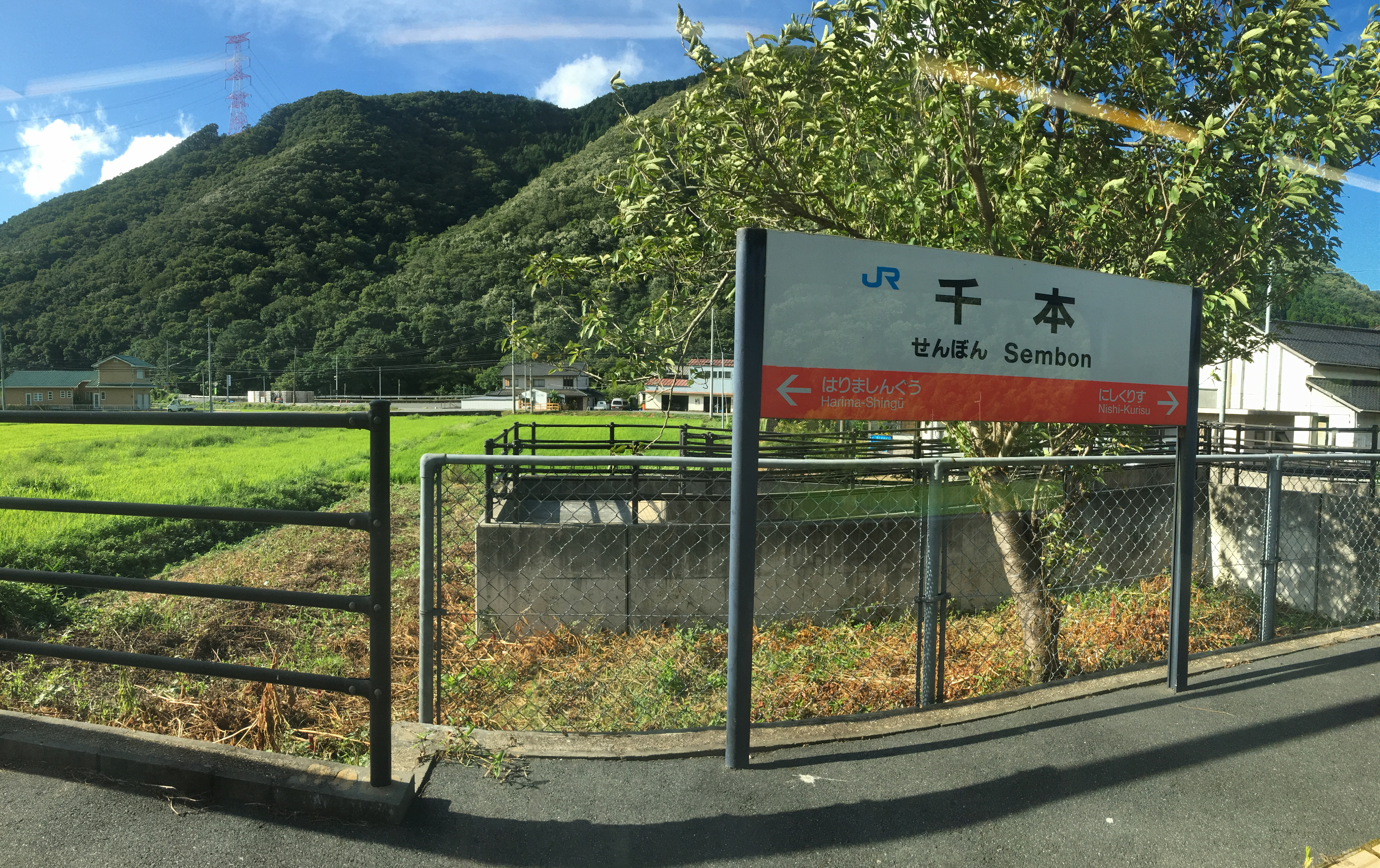
Station platform and sign, 2019

Sembon Station (千本駅, Sembon-eki) is a passenger railway station located in the city of Tatsuno, Hyōgo Prefecture, Japan, operated by West Japan Railway Company (JR West).

== Lines ==
Sembon Station is served by the Kishin Line, and is located 27.6 kilometers from the terminus of the line at Himeji.

== Station layout ==
The station consists of one ground-level side platform serving single bi-directional track. The station is unattended.

== History ==
Senbon Station opened on March 24, 1934. With the privatization of the Japan National Railways (JNR) on April 1, 1987, the station came under the aegis of the West Japan Railway Company.

== Passenger statistics ==
In fiscal 2019, the station was used by an average of 31 passengers daily.

== Surrounding area ==
- JA Hyogo Nishi Senbon Branch

== See also ==
- List of railway stations in Japan
