= Nishi-Aioi Station =

Railway station in Akō, Hyōgo Prefecture, Japan

Nishi-Aioi Station 西相生駅
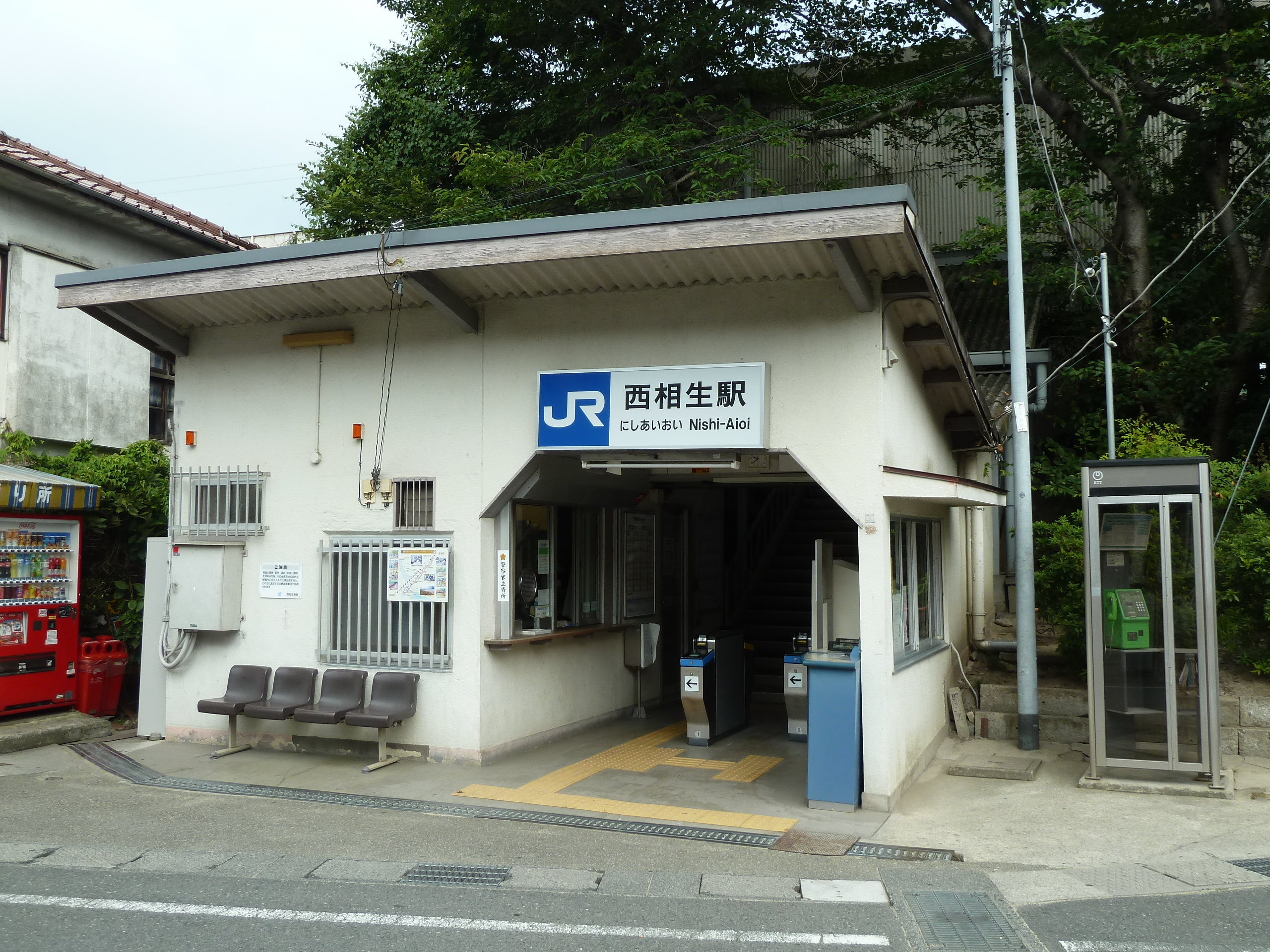
- Nishi-Aioi Station in July 2012

General information
- Location: 2-chōme-6 Sagata, Aioi-shi, Hyōgo-ken 678-0063; Japan
- Coordinates: 34.8014°N 134.4507°E
- Owner: West Japan Railway Company
- Operator: West Japan Railway Company
- Line: Akō Line
- Distance: 3.0 km (1.9 miles) from Aioi
- Platforms: 1 side platform
- Connections: Bus stop

Other information
- Status: Staffed
- Website: Official website

History
- Opened: 12 December 1951

Passengers
- FY2019: 740 daily
Location
- Location within Hyōgo Prefecture Location within Japan

Nishi-Aioi Station (西相生駅, Nishi-Aioi-eki) is a passenger railway station located in the city of Akō, Hyōgo Prefecture, Japan, operated by the West Japan Railway Company (JR West).

== Lines ==
Nishi-Aioi Station is served by the Akō Line, and is located 3.0 kilometers from the terminus of the line at Aioi, 23.7 kilometers from Himeji and 111.6 kilometers from Osaka.

== Station layout ==
The station consists of one ground-level side platform serving a single-directional track. The station is staffed.

== Adjacent stations ==
| « | Service | » |
JR West
Akō Line
| Aioi | - | Sakoshi |

== History ==
Nishi-Aioi Station was opened on December 12, 1951. With the privatization of the Japan National Railways (JNR) on April 1, 1987, the station came under the aegis of the West Japan Railway Company.

== Passenger statistics ==
In fiscal 2019, the station was used by an average of 740 passengers daily

== Surrounding area ==
- Hyogo Prefectural Aioi Industrial High School
- Aioi Bay
- IHI Aioi Factory
- Japan National Route 250

== See also ==
- List of railway stations in Japan
