= Harima-Shingū Station =

Railway station in Tatsuno, Hyōgo Prefecture, Japan

Harima-Shingū Station 播磨新宮駅
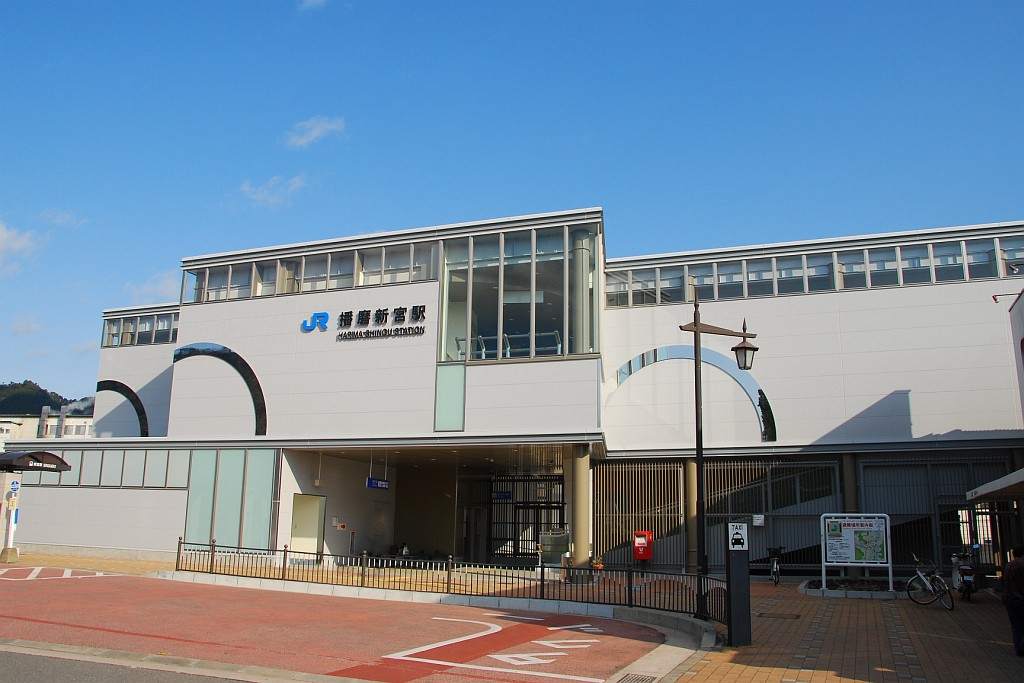
- Harima-Shingū Station, December 2010

General information
- Location: Shingū-chō Shingū, Tatsuno-shi, Hyōgo-ken 679-4313; Japan
- Coordinates: 34.9210°N 134.5463°E
- Owner: West Japan Railway Company
- Operator: West Japan Railway Company
- Line: Kishin Line
- Distance: 22.1 km (13.7 miles) from Himeji
- Platforms: 1 side + 1 island platforms
- Connections: Bus stop

Other information
- Status: Staffed (Midori no Madoguchi)
- Website: Official website

History
- Opened: 11 July 1932; 94 years ago

Passengers
- FY2019: 1246 daily

Services
Preceding station	JR West	Following station
Sembon towards Niimi	Kishin Line Local	Higashi-Hashisaki towards Himeji
Location
- Location within Hyōgo Prefecture Location within Japan

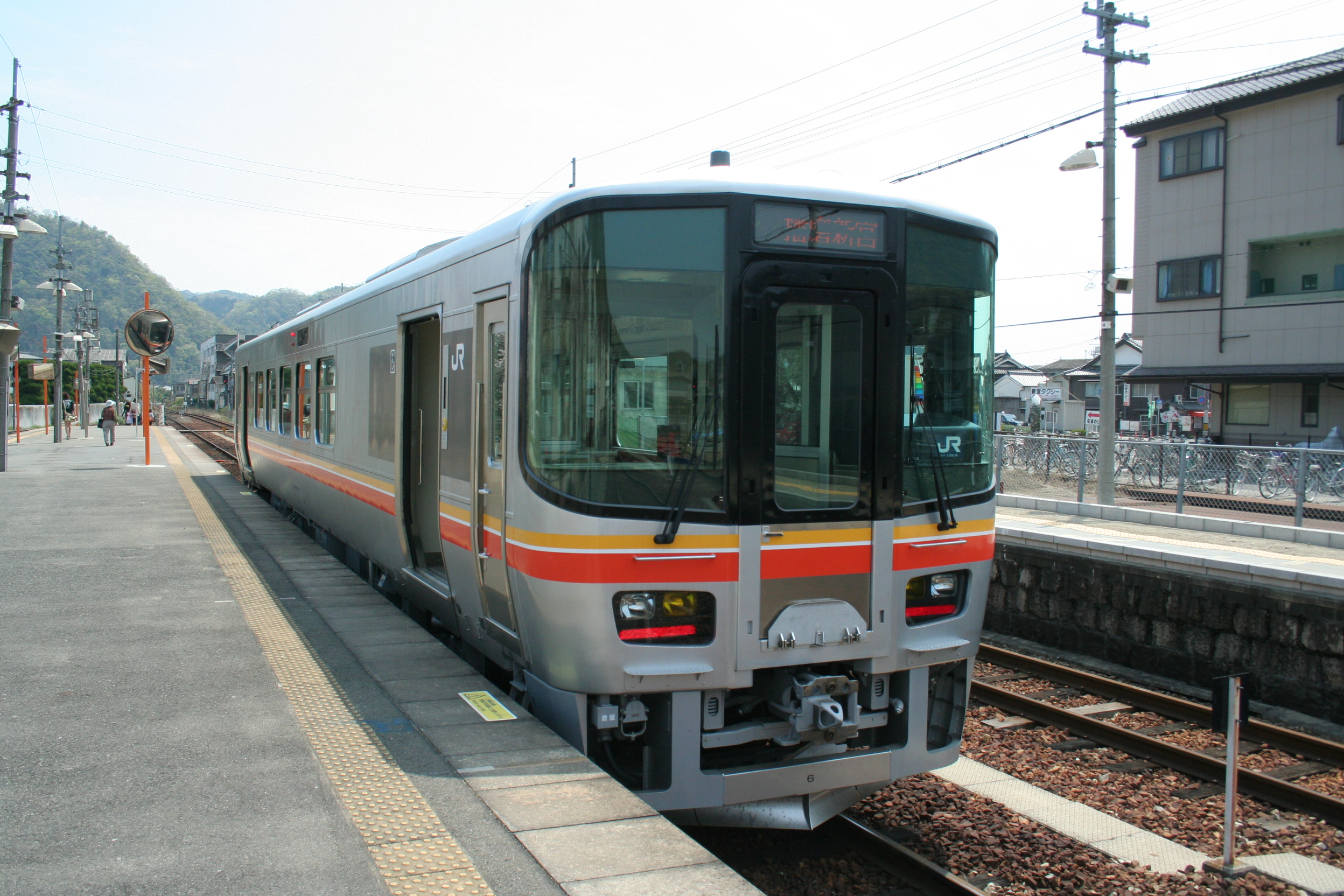

Harima-Shingū Station (播磨新宮駅, Harima-Shingū-eki) is a passenger railway station located in the city of Tatsuno, Hyōgo Prefecture, Japan, operated by West Japan Railway Company (JR West).

== Lines ==
Harima-Shingū Station is served by the Kishin Line, and is located 22.1 kilometers from the terminus of the line at Himeji.

== Station layout ==
The station consists of one side platform and one island platform connected by an elevated station building. The station has a Midori no Madoguchi staffed ticket office.

=== Platforms ===
1, 3	■ Kishin Line	for Sayo
1, 2, 3	■ Kishin Line	for Himeji

== History ==
Harima-Shingū Station opened on 11 July 1932. With the privatization of the Japan National Railways (JNR) on 1 April 1987, the station came under the aegis of the West Japan Railway Company.

== Passenger statistics ==
In fiscal 2019, the station was used by an average of 1246 passengers daily.

== Surrounding area ==
- Tatsuno City Shingū General Branch (former: Shingū Town Hall)
- Shingū Miyauchi Site
- Ibo River

== See also ==
- List of railway stations in Japan
