= Chieko Aioi =

Japanese actress and voice actress

- 相生 千恵子
- Aioi in 1958
- Born: Reiko Komatsu; December 28, 1934; Tokyo Prefecture, Japan
- Died: November 13, 2013 (aged 78); Tokyo, Japan
- Occupations: Actress; voice actress
- Years active: 1959–2008

Reiko Komatsu (小松 礼子, Komatsu Reiko, December 28, 1934 – November 13, 2013), professionally known as Chieko Aioi (相生 千恵子, Aioi Chieko), was a Japanese actress and voice actress.

Aioi was born on December 28, 1934, in Tokyo.

In 2008, Aioi suffered a subarachnoid hemorrhage which ended her acting career. She died of heart failure on November 13, 2013, aged 78, in Tokyo.

== Filmography ==
- Senba-zuru (1989) – Akagi
- Kyōfu gekijō umbalance (1973; TV series) – (ep 1)
- Mirai ni tsunagaru ko ra (1962) – Miss Mizutani
