= Aboshi Station =

Railway station in Himeji, Hyōgo Prefecture, Japan

Aboshi Station 網干駅
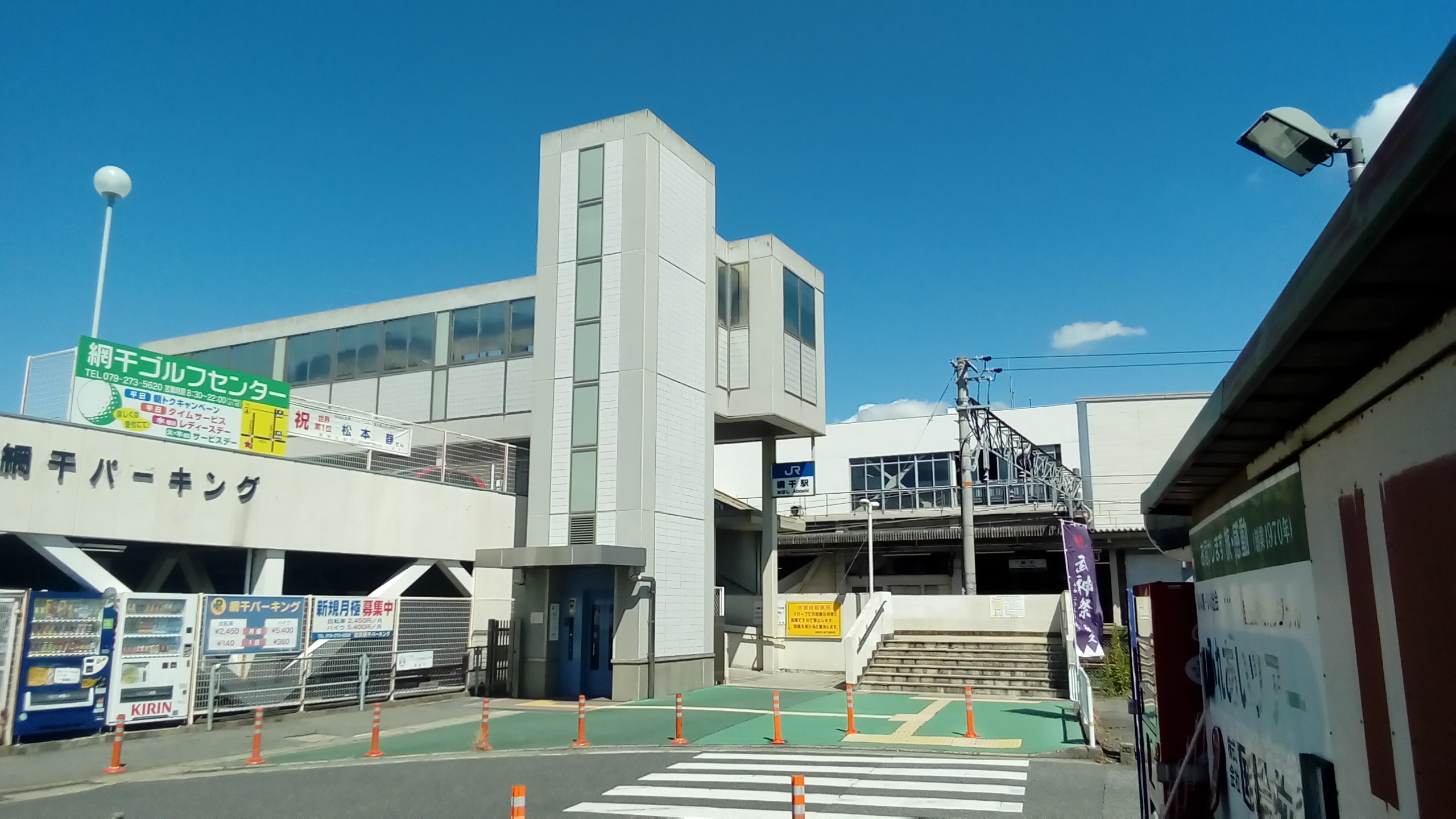
- Aboshi Station in September 2019

General information
- Location: Waku Aboshiku, Himeji-shi, Hyōgo-ken 671-1227; Japan
- Coordinates: 34°48′51.59″N 134°35′3.01″E
- Owner: West Japan Railway Company
- Operator: West Japan Railway Company
- Line: San'yō Main Line
- Distance: 65.1 km (40.5 miles) from Kobe
- Platforms: 2 side platforms
- Connections: Bus stop

Other information
- Status: Staffed
- Website: Official website

History
- Opened: 11 November 1889

Passengers
- FY2019: 7759 daily
Location
- Location within Hyōgo Prefecture Location within Japan

Aboshi Station (網干駅, Aboshi-eki) is a passenger railway station located in the city of Himeji, Hyōgo Prefecture, Japan, operated by the West Japan Railway Company (JR West).

== Lines ==
Aboshi Station is served by the JR San'yō Main Line, and is located 65.1 kilometers from the terminus of the line at Kobe and 98.2 kilometers from Osaka.

== Station layout ==
The station consists of one ground-level side platform and one ground-level island platform connected by a footbridge. The station is staffed.

=== Platforms ===
| 1 | ■ San'yō Main Line | for Kamigōri and Okayama |
| 2, 3 | ■ San'yō Main Line | for Himeji and Osaka |

== Adjacent stations ==
| « | Service | » |
JR West
Sanyō Main Line (JR Kobe Line)
Limited Express Super Hakuto: Does not stop at this station
| Harima-Katsuhara | Special Rapid | Tatsuno |
| Harima-Katsuhara | Local; Rapid service: Nishi-Akashi or Akashi - Takatsuki or Kyoto | Tatsuno |

== History ==
Aboshi Station was opened on 11 November 1889. With the privatization of the Japan National Railways (JNR) on 1 April 1987, the station came under the aegis of the West Japan Railway Company.

== Passenger statistics ==
In fiscal 2019, the station was used by an average of 7759 passengers daily

== Surrounding area ==
- Hyogo Prefectural Taishi High School
- Japan National Route 179

== See also ==
- List of railway stations in Japan
