= Tatsuno Station (Hyōgo) =

Railway station in Tatsuno, Hyōgo Prefecture, Japan

Tatsuno Station 竜野駅
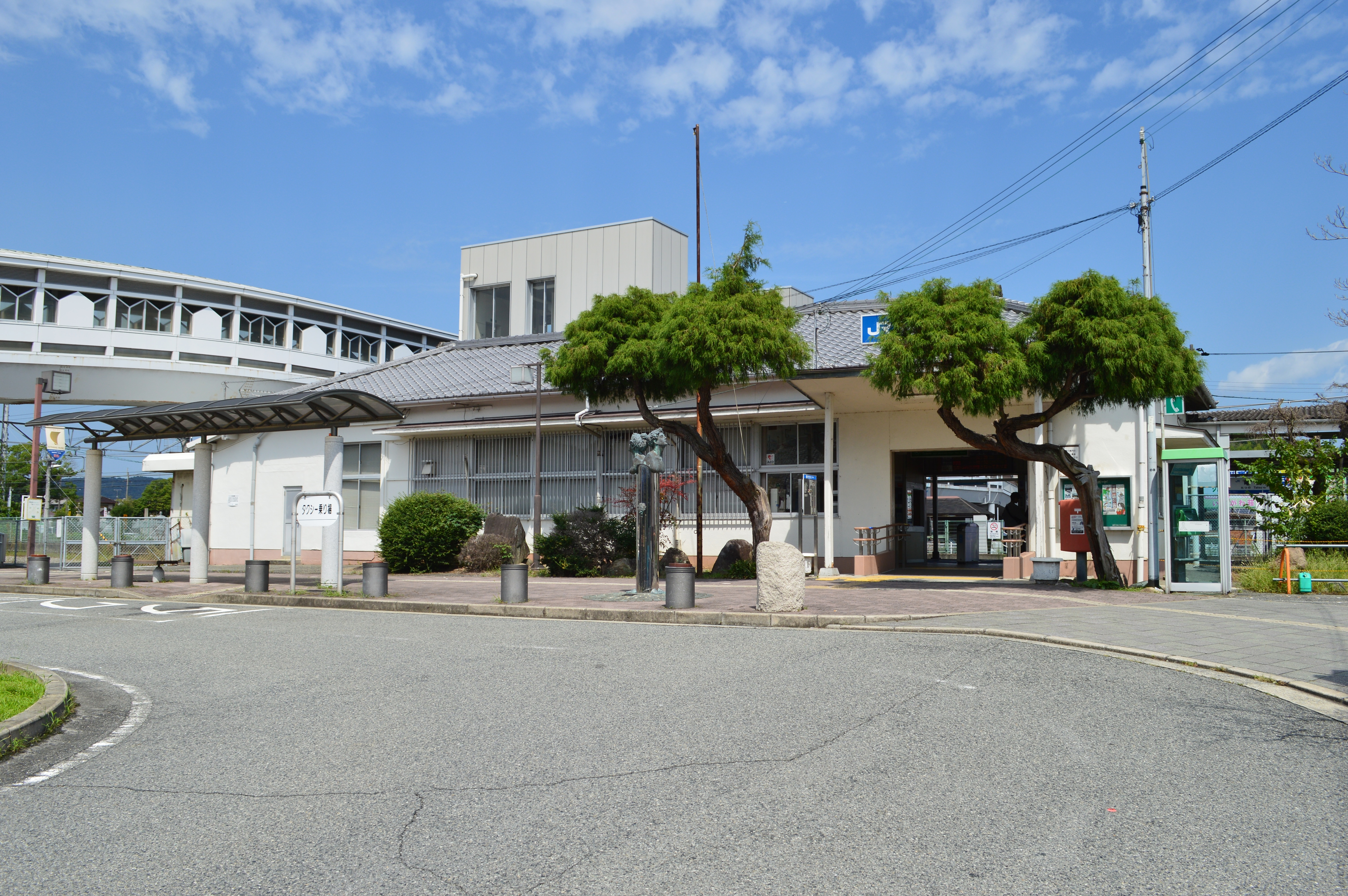
- Tatsuno Station in August 2019

General information
- Location: Ibogawacho Kibita, Tatsuo-shi, Hyōgo-ken 671-1632; Japan
- Coordinates: 34.8249°N 134.5220°E
- Owner: West Japan Railway Company
- Operator: West Japan Railway Company
- Line: San'yō Main Line
- Distance: 71.0 km (44.1 miles) from Kobe
- Platforms: 2 side platforms
- Connections: Bus stop

Other information
- Status: Staffed (Midori no Madoguchi)
- Website: Official website

History
- Opened: 11 November 1889

Passengers
- FY2019: 2204 daily
Location
- Location within Hyōgo Prefecture Location within Japan

Tatsuno Station (竜野駅, Tatsuno-eki) is a passenger railway station located in the city of Tatsuno, Hyōgo Prefecture, Japan, operated by the West Japan Railway Company (JR West). A new station building is under construction and is scheduled to open in July 2025.

== Lines ==
Tatsuno Station is served by the JR San'yō Main Line, and is located 71.0 kilometers from the terminus of the line at Kobe and 104.1 kilometers from Osaka.

== Station layout ==
The station consists of two ground-level opposed side platforms connected by a footbridge. The station has a Midori no Madoguchi staffed ticket office.

=== Platforms ===
1	■ San'yō Main Line	for Kamigōri and Okayama
2	■ San'yō Main Line	for Himeji and Osaka

== Adjacent stations ==
«	Service	»
JR West
Sanyō Main Line
Limited Express Super Hakuto: Does not stop at this station
Aboshi	Special Rapid	Aioi
Aboshi	Local; Rapid service: Nishi-Akashi or Akashi - Takatsuki or Kyoto	Aioi

== History ==
Tatsuno Station was opened on 11 November 1889. With the privatization of the Japan National Railways (JNR) on 1 April 1987, the station came under the aegis of the West Japan Railway Company.

== Passenger statistics ==
In fiscal 2019, the station was used by an average of 2204 passengers daily

== Surrounding area ==
- Tatsuno City Hall Ibogawa General Branch (formerly Ibogawa Town Hall)
- Tatsuno City General Cultural Center Aqua Hall
- Ibogawa Post Office

== See also ==
- List of railway stations in Japan
