= Shingū, Hyōgo =

Shingū, Hyōgo 新宮町
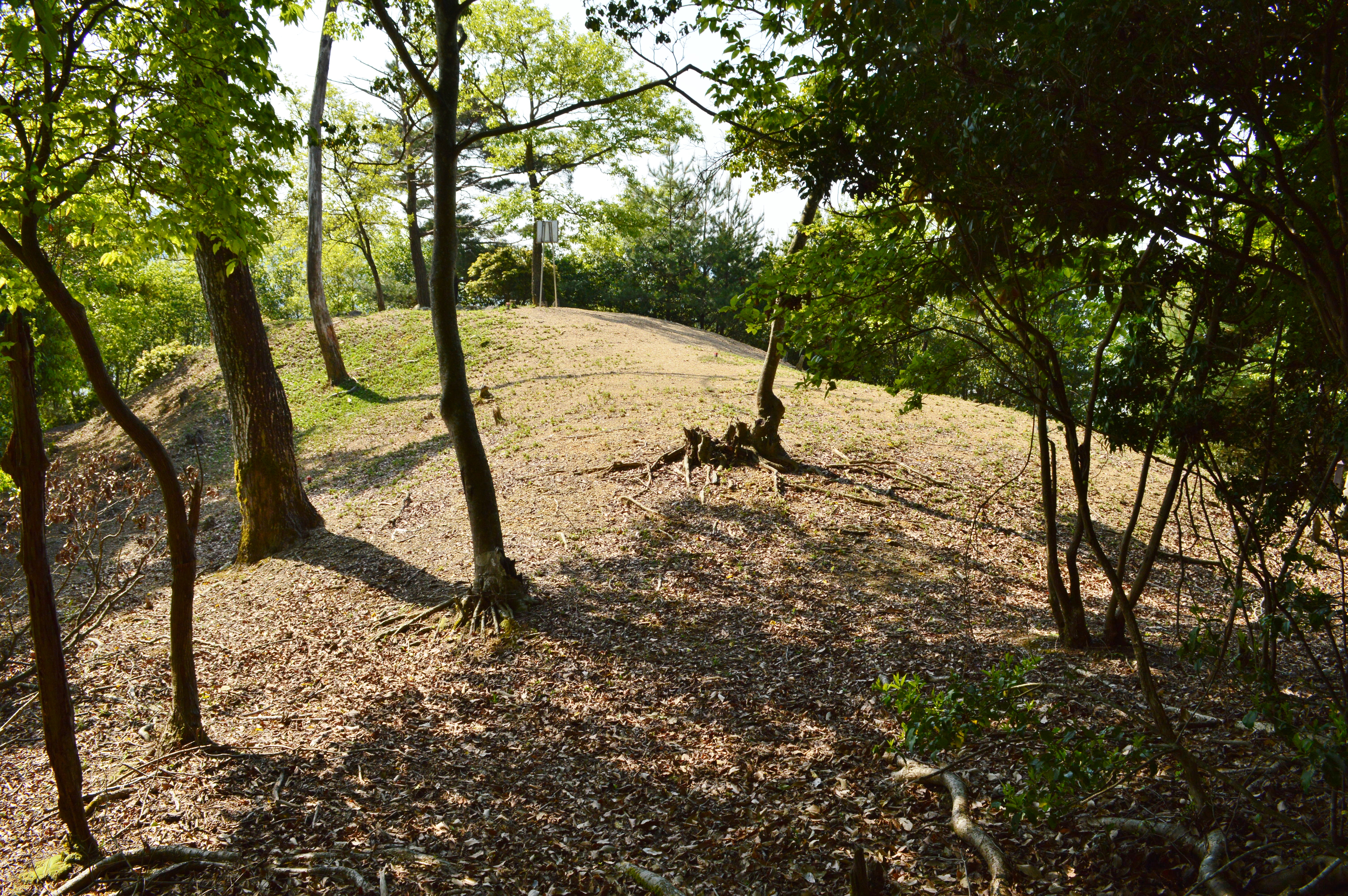
- Yoshima Kofun

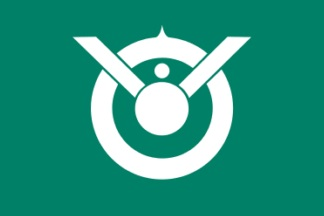
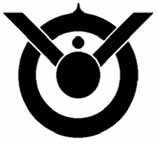
- Flag Seal
- Interactive map of Shingū, Hyōgo
- Coordinates: 34°55′07″N 134°32′58″E

Area
  - Total: 99.55 km^{2} (38.44 sq mi)

Population
  - Estimate (September 1, 2005): 16,918
- Time zone: Japan Standard Time

Shingū (新宮町, Shingū-chō) was a town located in Ibo District, Hyōgo Prefecture, Japan.

== Population ==
As of 2003, the town had an estimated population of 17,139 and a density of 172.16 persons per km^{2}. The total area was 99.55 km^{2}.

== History ==
On October 1, 2005, Shingū, along with the towns of Ibogawa and Mitsu (all from Ibo District), was merged into the expanded city of Tatsuno.

== Attractions ==
The town of Shingū was located approximately 35 km west of the city of Himeji. The town consisted of numerous old homes of traditional Japanese design and sits among abundant rice fields. The town is surrounded on three sides by mountains of several hundred feet.
