= Maiki temple ruins =

Maiki-ji temple ruins
- 舞木廃寺
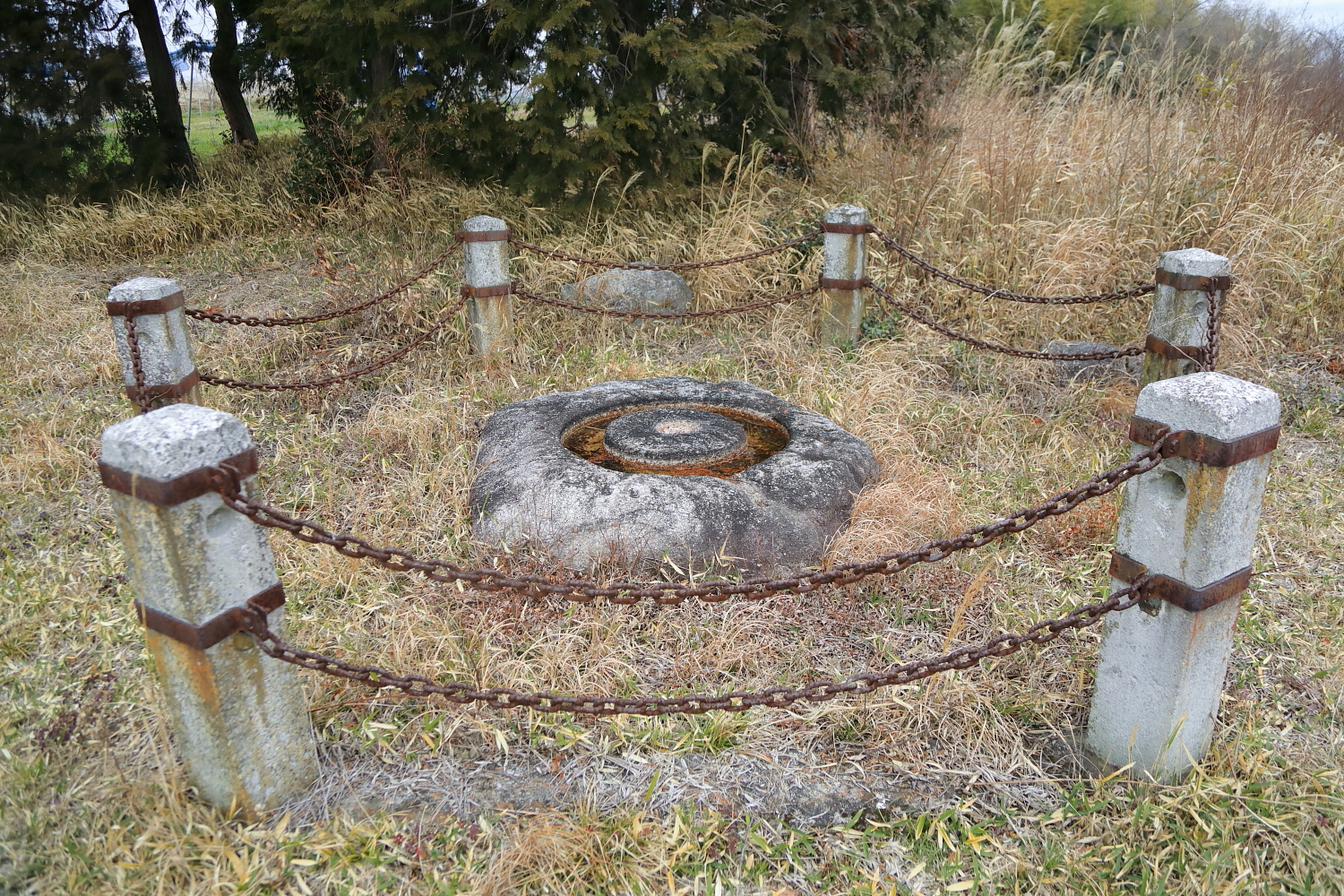
- Maiki-ji temple ruins

- Location within Aichi Prefecture Location within Japan

Religion
- Affiliation: Buddhist
- Status: ruins

Location
- Location: Toyota, Aichi
- Country: Japan
- Interactive map of Maiki-ji temple ruins
- Coordinates: 35°08′44″N 137°10′11″E

The Maiki temple ruins (舞木廃寺跡, Maiki Haiji ato) is an archaeological site with the ruins of a Nara period Buddhist temple located in the Sanage neighborhood of the city of Toyota, Aichi, Japan. The temple no longer exists but the ruins of the foundation of its pagoda was designated as a National Historic Site in 1929.

== Overview ==
The Maiki temple ruins are located on a hill on the left bank of the Kagogawa River, and takes its name from the local hamlet, as the original name of the temple is unknown. Many fragments of roof tiles, Sue ware pottery and other artifacts from the Nara period have been discovered, but a formal archaeological excavation has not been conducted. The six-petal lotus flower motif roof tiles appear to be of the same design and origin as the Kitano temple ruins, located further south in Aichi Prefecture.

The layout of the temple is also uncertain, as the only indication of a temple is the granite foundation base stone of a pagoda, which has a diameter of 1.6 meters, with an almost circular 15-cm diameter hole for the central pillar. This stone is surrounded by three stones which may have been cornerstones. The foundation is considered significant, as very few pagoda foundations from this period have remained intact. Aside from the pagoda foundation, the remainder of the site is in very poor condition due to urban encroachment and a trench survey conducted by the Toyota City Board of Education in 2002 found nothing of consequence.

The site has been backfilled, and there are no ruins visible today. The site is a ten-minute walk from the "Mōgi" bus stop on the Meitetsu bus from the Toyotashi Station on the Meitetsu Mikawa Line.

== See also ==
- List of Historic Sites of Japan (Aichi)
