= Akazu ware =

Type of Japanese pottery

Akazu ware (赤津焼, Akazu-yaki) is a type of Japanese pottery produced from the Akazu district, located in the eastern side of Seto, Aichi Prefecture.

== Overview ==
It is believed that the kilns producing Akazu ware were developed alongside Seto kilns during the Heian period, with kiln remains from the Muromachi period, the Konagasō kiln ruins, still remaining in the Seto area. During the Sengoku period, a rapid decrease of the number of kiln workshops, given the name "Setoyama risan" (The Seto Dispersion) occurred, with many kiln workshops being transferred to the Mino region.

It was originally believed that in 1610, Tokugawa Yoshinao, the first feudal lord of the Owari fiefdom, intended to gather potters from the Akazu village to restore the Seto kilns (in other words calling back the kiln makers). However, in recent years, based on material from existing documents, it is now considered that Tokugawa Ieyasu, in line with the establishment of the shogunate in Nagoya, called back the kiln makers.

Additionally, in 1616, Ieyasu called on potters from Akazu to relocate to Nagoya Castle, constructing a kiln in the Ofukemaru area. The kiln was discontinued in 1871 following the abolition of the feudal system, but is still known as "Bishu Oniwa-yaki." Through his service at the Oniwa-yaki, Chen Yuan-Hin introduced the until then unknown techniques of Annan-style Gosu illustrations to the workshop, and has come to be known as "Ofukei glaze." In 1807, Katou Tamikichi introduced hard-paste porcelain manufacturing methods to Seto. However, this type of type of manufacturing did not gain popularity, and to this day, soft-paste porcelain remains Seto's primary porcelain export.

=== Present Time ===
Seven types of glaze (ash glaze, iron glaze, Koseto glaze, Kiseto glaze, Shino glaze, Oribe glaze, Ofukei glaze) and 12 types of adornment methods have been passed down to the present day. In 1977, Akazu ware was designated as a Japanese traditional craft. As of February 2010, a counted 14 craftsmen still maintain the practice.

== Akazu Ware Pottery Museum ==
Akazu Ware Pottery Museum
- 赤津焼会館

General information
- Completed: 1980

Technical details
- Floor count: 2

In 1980, the Akazu Ware Pottery Museum was established with the goal of preserving research and folk materials related to Akazu ware.

Located on a hill of Akazu town, the museum has a characteristic appearance with its outer walls being covered by Oribe glaze ceramic tiles. The museum interior is equipped with a meeting room tasked for research as well as a room for displaying and selling Akazu ware ranging from tea sets and vases to general-use pottery.

== See also ==
- List of Traditional Crafts of Japan
