= Ōguruwa Shell Midden =

Archaeological site in Mizuho-ku, Nagoya, Japan

- 大曲輪貝塚 (Japanese)
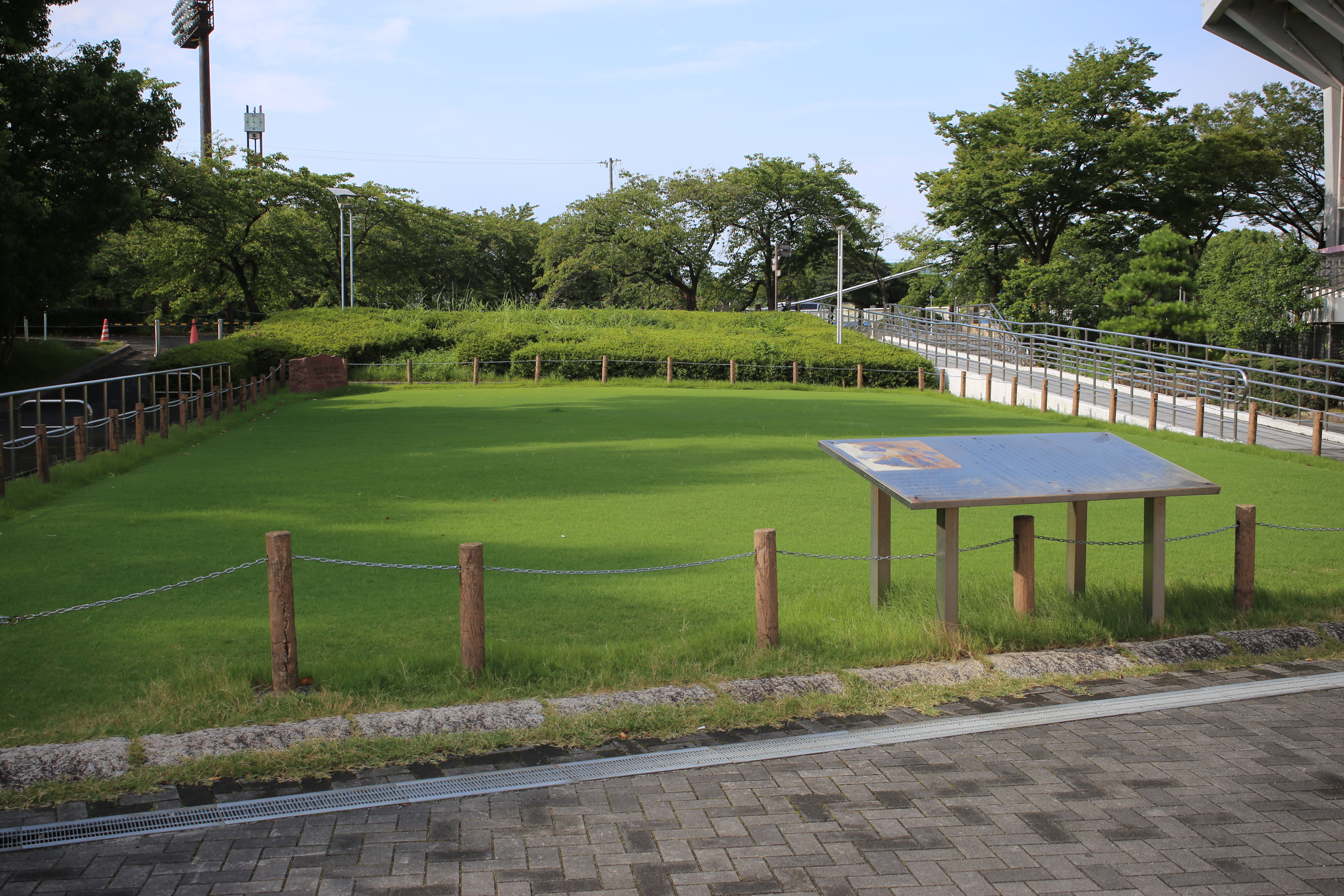
- Ōguruwa Shell Midden

- Ōguruwa Shell Midden Ōguruwa Shell Midden (Japan)
- 35°07′12″N 136°56′35″E
- Type: midden, settlement
- Periods: Jōmon period
- Location: Mizuho-ku, Nagoya, Aichi, Japan
- Region: Tōkai region

Site notes
- Public access: None

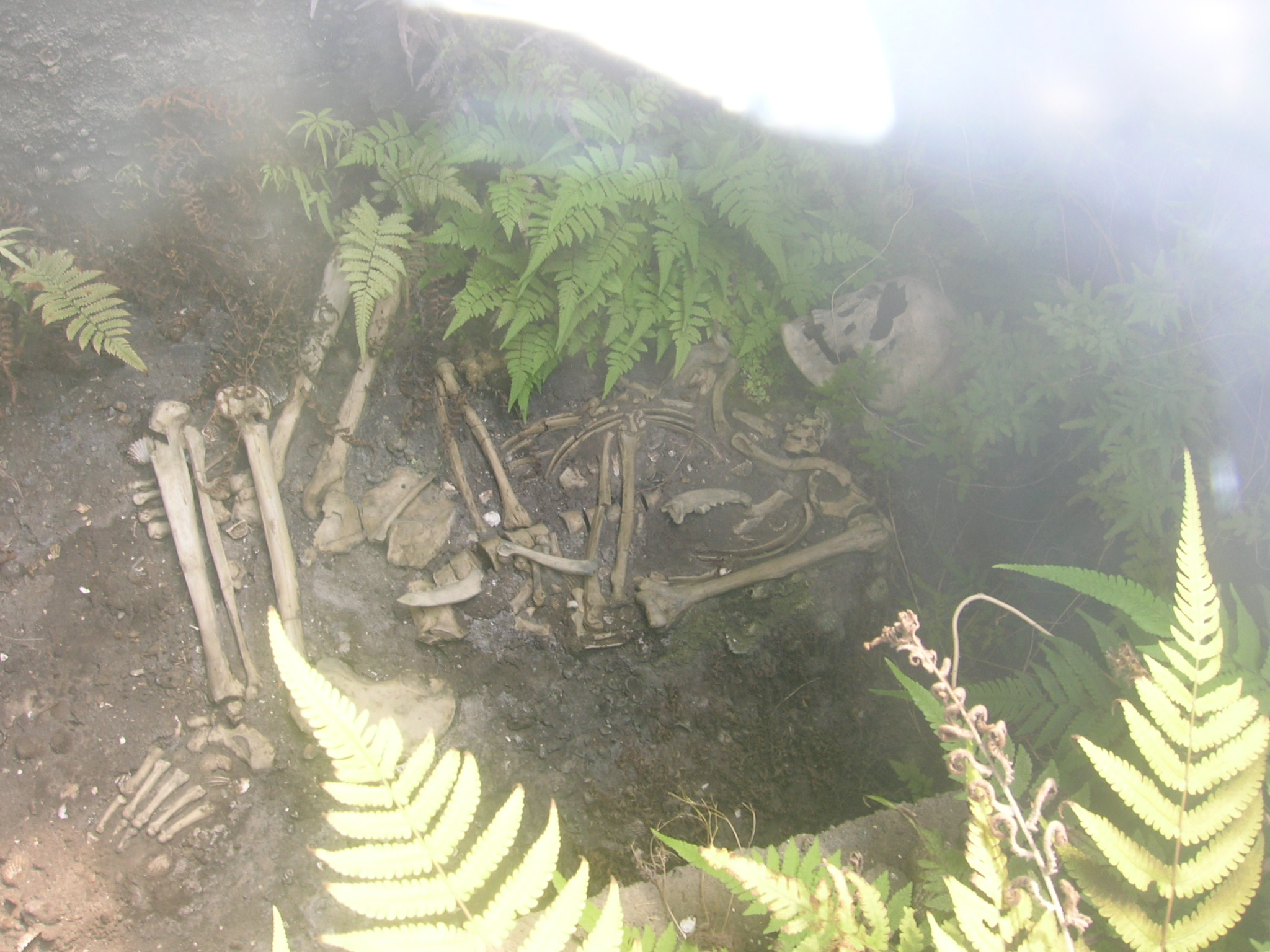
Oguruwa shell mounds-Flexed burial

The Ōguruwa Shell Midden (大曲輪貝塚, Ōguruwa kaizuka) is an archaeological site with a shell midden and Jōmon period settlement site located in the Yamashitatori neighborhood of Mizuho ward of Nagoya, Aichi Prefecture in the Tōkai region of Japan. The site was designated a National Historic Site of Japan in 1941.

== Overview ==
During the early to middle Jōmon period (approximately 4000 to 2500 BC), sea levels were five to six meters higher than at present, and the ambient temperature was also 2 deg C higher. During this period, the Kantō region was inhabited by the Jōmon people, many of whom lived in coastal settlements. The middens associated with such settlements contain bone, botanical material, mollusc shells, sherds, lithics, and other artifacts and ecofacts associated with the now-vanished inhabitants, and these features, provide a useful source into the diets and habits of Jōmon society. Most of these middens are found along the Pacific coast of Japan.

The Ōguruwa Shell Midden was discovered during the construction of the Mizuho Athletic Stadium in 1939, and despite the designation as a national historic site in 1941, construction of the stadium proceeded over the site. In 1980, when an old stand was demolished for reconstruction of the stadium, it was confirmed that the shell midden remained in good condition, and an archaeological excavation of about 2200 square meters found a complex ruins from the early Jōmon period with four shell middens. The middens mainly consisted of shells from large oysters and crabs, and had a thickness of over one meter. The ruins of the settlement are located in the estuary flood plain of the Yamazaki River, with sand and gravel layers containing rubble of a large size. The Shimouchida Kaizuka found on the opposite bank of the Yamazaki River is also considered to be part of the same settlement, which was occupied through the Yayoi period into the Kofun period.

The site also had numerous tombs from the late Jōmon period, with many grave goods, including stone axes, Jōmon pottery and jewelry, as well as several almost complete human remains. The human remains were buried in a fetal position, and are unique in that the bones of a dog were also found on the chest of each body, indicating that they were buried together. In addition to the tombs, the foundations of several pit dwellings were found.

The excavated items are stored in the Nagoya City Museum.

== See also ==
- List of Historic Sites of Japan (Aichi)
