= Urigō ruins =

- 瓜郷遺跡 (Japanese)
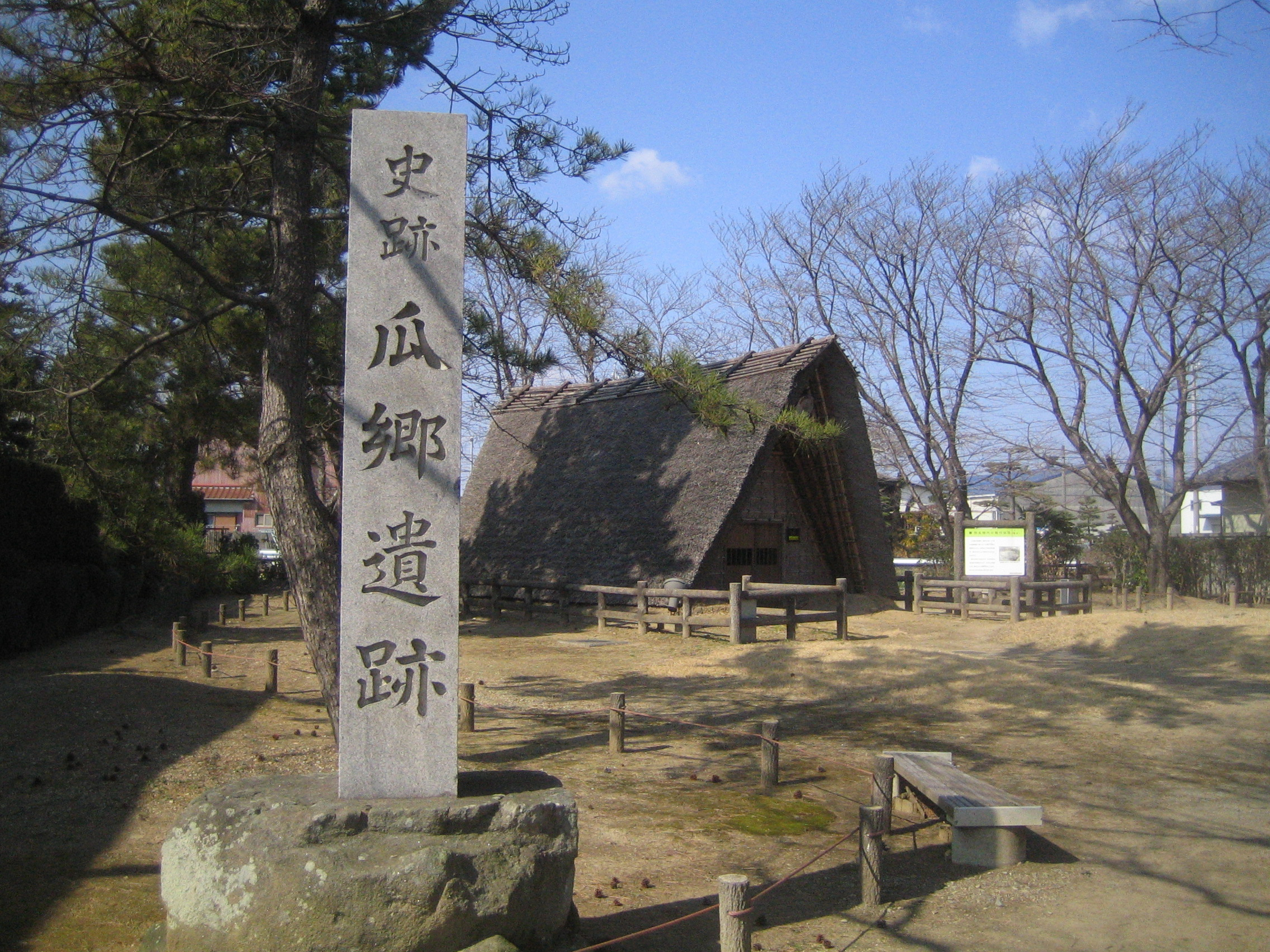
- Urigō ruins

- Urigō ruins Urigō ruins (Japan)
- 34°47′07″N 137°22′31″E
- Periods: Yayoi period
- Location: Toyohashi, Aichi, Japan
- Region: Tōkai region

Site notes
- Public access: Yes (archaeological park)

The Urigō ruins (瓜郷遺跡, Urigō iseki) is an archaeological site containing the ruins of a Yayoi period settlement, located in what is now part of the city of Toyohashi, Aichi Prefecture in the Tōkai region of Japan. It was designated a National Historic Site of Japan in 1953.

== Overview ==
The Urigō site is located on the alluvial lowland of the lower Toyokawa River downstream from the center of modern Toyohashi city. It was discovered in 1936 and excavated from 1947 to 1948, and again in 1952. The site contained a midden from the mid to late-Yayoi period, with a thickness of 1.3 meters, which contained roughly textured Yayoi pottery with a comb design, stone tools, bone needles, parts of looms and other wooden tools, and other artifacts. The quality and quantity of the artifacts has been compared to those found at the Toro ruins in Shizuoka prefecture, and indicate that rice paddy cultivation was carried out in the alluvial area of the lower Toyokawa River from an early period, although the actual remains of rice paddies have not yet been found. The site also did not contain the remains of any pit dwellings, although post holes indicated that raised floor buildings may have been constructed on this site due to the marshy nature of the area.

The site is approximately 13 minutes on foot from JR Iida Line Shimoji Station and is now an archaeological park with faux reproductions of Yayoi period buildings.

== See also ==
- List of Historic Sites of Japan (Aichi)
