= Dodo Sue Ware Kiln ruins =

Archaeological site in Tahara, Tõkai, Japan

- 百々陶器窯跡 (Japanese)
- Dodo Sue Ware Kiln ruins Dodo Sue Ware Kiln ruins (Japan)
- 34°38′43″N 137°17′57″E
- Type: kiln ruins
- Periods: Heian - Kamakura
- Location: Tahara, Aichi, Japan
- Region: Tōkai region

Site notes
- Area: 1,079 m^{2} (11,610 sq ft)
- Public access: Yes (no public facilities)

The Dodo Sue Ware Kiln Site (百々陶器窯跡, Dodo Sue-ki kama ato) is an archaeological site containing late Heian to early Kamakura period kilns located in the Mutsure neighborhood of the city of Tahara, Aichi in the Tōkai region of Japan. It was designated as a National Historic Site in 1922.

== Overview ==
The Dodo Sue Ware Kiln was a Sue ware pottery production site approximately four kilometers southeast of the modern city center of Tahara, in a hilly forest. After World War II, many ruins of kilns have been discovered in the Atsumi Peninsula dating from the late Heian period to the early Kamakura period, thus shedding light on the origins of several styles of pottery which until that time were uncertain. The Dodo site contains two nobori-gama kilns built side-by-side on a hill, utilizing a south-facing slope. These kilns were used to produce everyday items, such as small bowls, plates, tea cups, etc.

The site is located approximately 18 minutes by car from Toyohashi Railroad Atsumi Line Mikawa-Tahara Station.

== See also ==
- List of Historic Sites of Japan (Aichi)
