= Ōhira Ichirizuka =

- 大平一里塚 (Japanese)
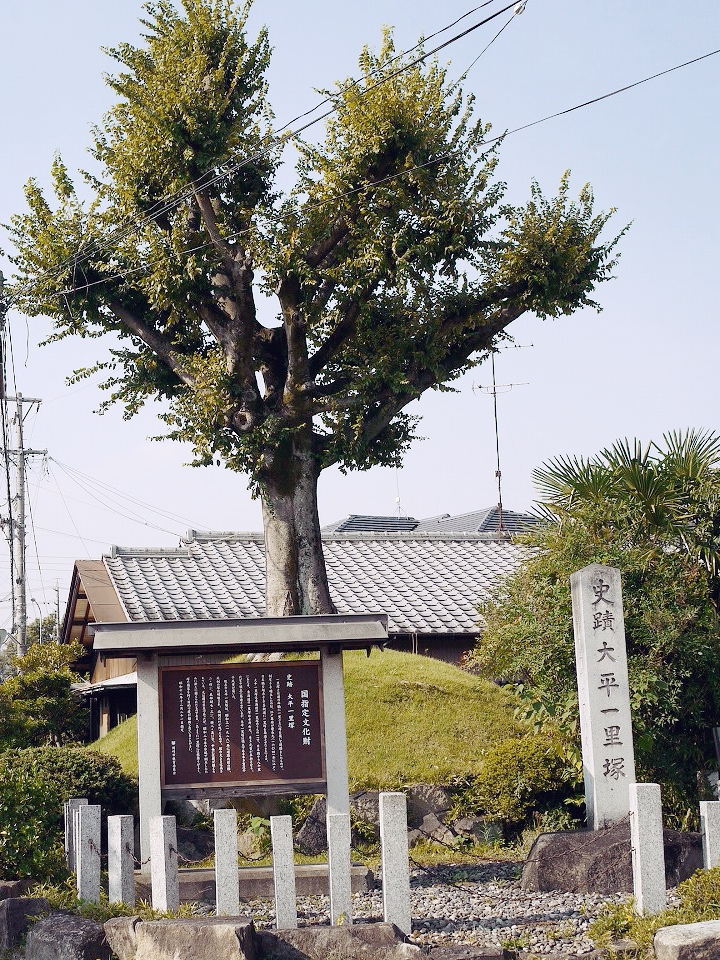
- Ōhira Ichirizuka

- Ōhira Ichirizuka Ōhira Ichirizuka (Japan)
- 34°56′29″N 137°11′37″E
- Periods: Edo period
- Location: Okazaki, Aichi, Japan
- Region: Tōkai region

Site notes
- Public access: Yes

Ōhira Ichirizuka (大平一里塚) is a historic Japanese distance marker akin to a milestone, located in what is now part of the city of Okazaki, Aichi Prefecture in the Tōkai region of Japan. It was designated a National Historic Site of Japan in 1937.

== Overview ==
During the Edo period Tokugawa shogunate established ichirizuka on major roads, enabling calculation both of distance travelled and of the charge for transportation by kago or palanquin. These markers, comprising a pair of earthen mounds, denoted the distance in ri (3.927 kilometres (2.440 mi)) to Nihonbashi, the "Bridge of Japan", erected in Edo in 1603. They were typically planted with an enoki or Japanese red pine to provide shelter for travelers. Since the Meiji period, most of the ichirizuka have disappeared, having been destroyed by the elements, modern highway construction and urban encroachment. In 1876, the "Ichirizuka Abolition decree" was issued by the Meiji government and many were demolished at that time. Currently, 17 surviving ichirizuka are designated as national historic sites.

In the case of the Ōhira ichirizuka, the mounds flank the Tōkaidō which connected Edo with Kyoto, between the post stations of Okazaki-juku and Fujikawa-juku. The surrounding lands around this marker were tenryō territory, administered from the nearby Ohira daikansho, and the local magistrate, Honda Narishige, supervised the construction. The northern mound was destroyed in 1928 due to road construction work, and only the southern mound was preserved. The mound is approximately 2.4 meters in height and 7.6 to 8.5 meters in diameter. An Enoki tree was planted by the mound at the time of its construction, but this tree was destroyed by a typhoon in 1958, and the tree presently on the mound is its replacement.

== See also ==
- List of Historic Sites of Japan (Aichi)
