= Shingū ruins =

- 真宮遺跡 (Japanese)
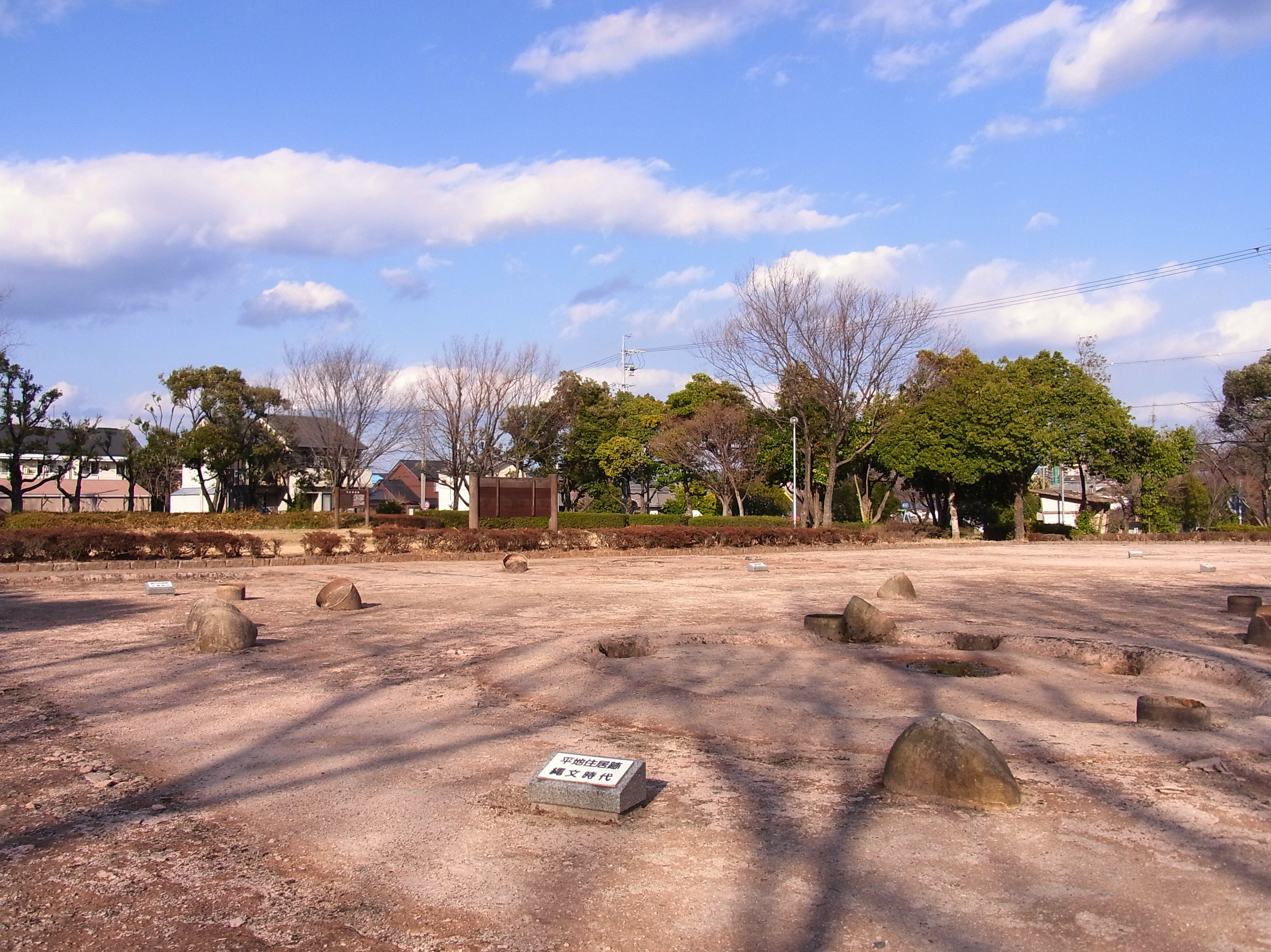
- Shingū ruins

- Shingū ruins Shingū ruins (Japan)
- 34°47′07″N 137°22′31″E
- Type: Settlement trace
- Periods: Jomon - Kamakura period
- Location: Okazaki, Aichi, Japan
- Region: Tōkai region

Site notes
- Area: 9,495.78
- Public access: Yes (archaeological park)

The Shingū ruins (真宮遺跡, Shingū iseki) archaeological site containing a ruins of a village complex which was inhabited from the late Jōmon period through the Kamakura period, located in the Shingū neighborhood of the city of Okazaki, Aichi in the Tōkai region of Japan. It was designated a National Historic Site of Japan in 1976.

== Overview ==
The Shingū site is located on a river terrace of the Yahagi River near its conjunction with the Oto River. The site was discovered in 1973. The ruins cover a wide area of 40,000 square meters and has only been partially excavated. Thus far, the foundations for 12 pit dwellings from the Jōmon period, 37 clay-jar burials, six dirt burials and one square-sided tumulus from the Yayoi period, 11 pit dwellings from the Kofun period, 6 pit dwellings from the Nara period, 19 pit dwellings and one raised floor building form the Heian period have been discovered. Artifacts included a large number of items, with including earthenware and stoneware shards, ceremonial stone swords, and clay figurines from the Yayoi period. Sue ware and pottery from the Kofun and Heian periods were also found. The ruins are valuable in that they present a record of continuous occupation from the Jōmon through Kamakura periods.

Excavations were carried out more than a dozen times from 1974 when the site was endangered by a nearby housing development. It is currently backfilled by one meter of earth to protect the ruins, but an archaeological park has been established with six reproductions of residences from the late Jōmon period, 30 earthenware tombs from the Yayoi period and one square tomb from the Kofun period. In the past, most of the excavated items were displayed at the Okazaki City Folk Museum, but are now stored at the Okazaki City Museum of Art.

The park is located five minutes on foot from the "Naka Rokumyocho" bus stop on the Meitetsu Bus from Higashi-Okazaki Station on the Meitetsu Nagoya Main Line .

== See also ==
- List of Historic Sites of Japan (Aichi)
