= Magoshi-Nagahizuka Kofun =

- 馬越長火塚古墳群 (Japanese)
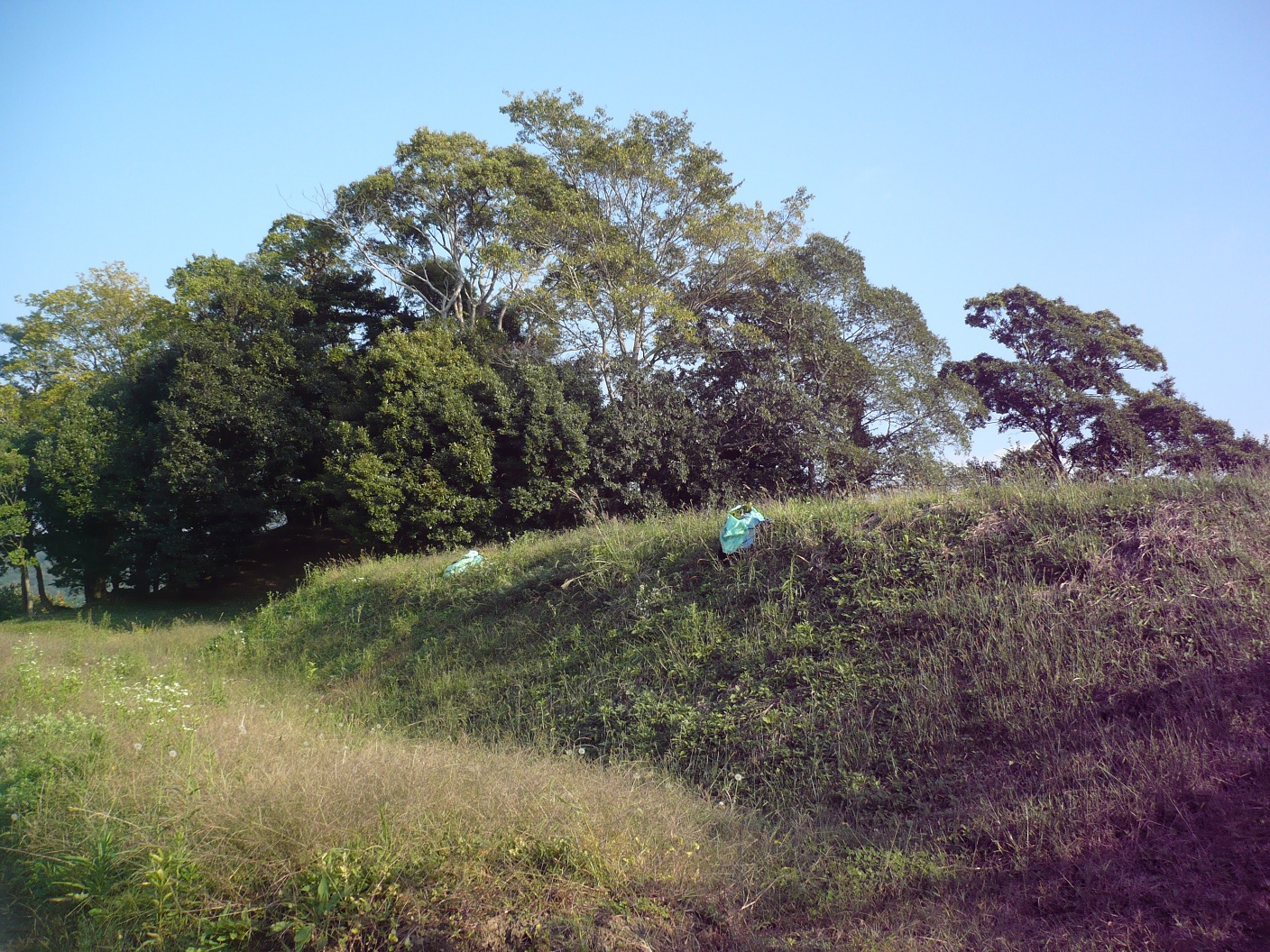
- Magoshi-Nagahizuka Kofun

- Magoshi-Nagahizuka Kofun Magoshi-Nagahizuka Kofun (Japan)
- 34°48′54″N 137°26′52″E
- Type: kofun
- Periods: Kofun period
- Location: Toyohashi, Aichi, Japan
- Region: Tōkai region

Site notes
- Public access: None

The Magoshi-Nagahizuka Kofun (馬越長火塚古墳) is a large Kofun period burial mound located in the Ishimakihonmachi neighborhood of the city of Toyohashi, Aichi in the Tōkai region of Japan. The site was designated a National Historic Site of Japan in 2016.

== Overview ==
The Magoshi-Nagahizuka Kofun is one of the largest kofun in the Tōkai region. It has a length of 70 meters and a height of 5.5 meters, and is believed to have been built in the late Kofun period, at around the end of the 6th century AD.

The tumulus is a zenpō-kōen-fun (前方後円墳), which is shaped like a keyhole, having one square end and one circular end, when viewed from above. However, this tumulus is unusual in that there is a large disparity between the posterior circular portion and the anterior rectangular portion. The closest other example of this design is the Misemaruyama Kofun in Kashihara, Nara, which is the purported tomb of Emperor Kinmei.

The tomb contains a multi-chambered stone-lined passageway with a length of 17 meters, and a multi-room stone-lined burial chamber.The ceiling has an arc-shaped vertical cross section and there is a single megalith forming the back wall. The chamber was found to contain a large number of grave goods, including a gold-plated horse harness. This type of harness, with apricot-leaf shaped decorations, is known from other burials to have been given by the Yamato state to the highest-ranking local lords under its suzerainty, and therefore this tomb is likely to be that of the local king of East Mikawa.

In 1944, during the Pacific War, the burial chamber was used as an ammunition storehouse by the Imperial Japanese Army.

Some 311 items which were excavated from the kofun were collectively designated as Important Cultural Properties of Japan in 2012. These included an extensive number of gold-plated horse fittings, including bells, bridles, harnesses, and stirrups, as well as sword, spears, bows and arrows, agricultural implements, and a large number of beads made from various materials and in various sizes and shapes, as well as a large number of Sue ware pottery.

The site is located on a narrow farm road surrounded by persimmon fields some distance from the prefectural road. There is a parking lot for visitors, but no other public facilities.

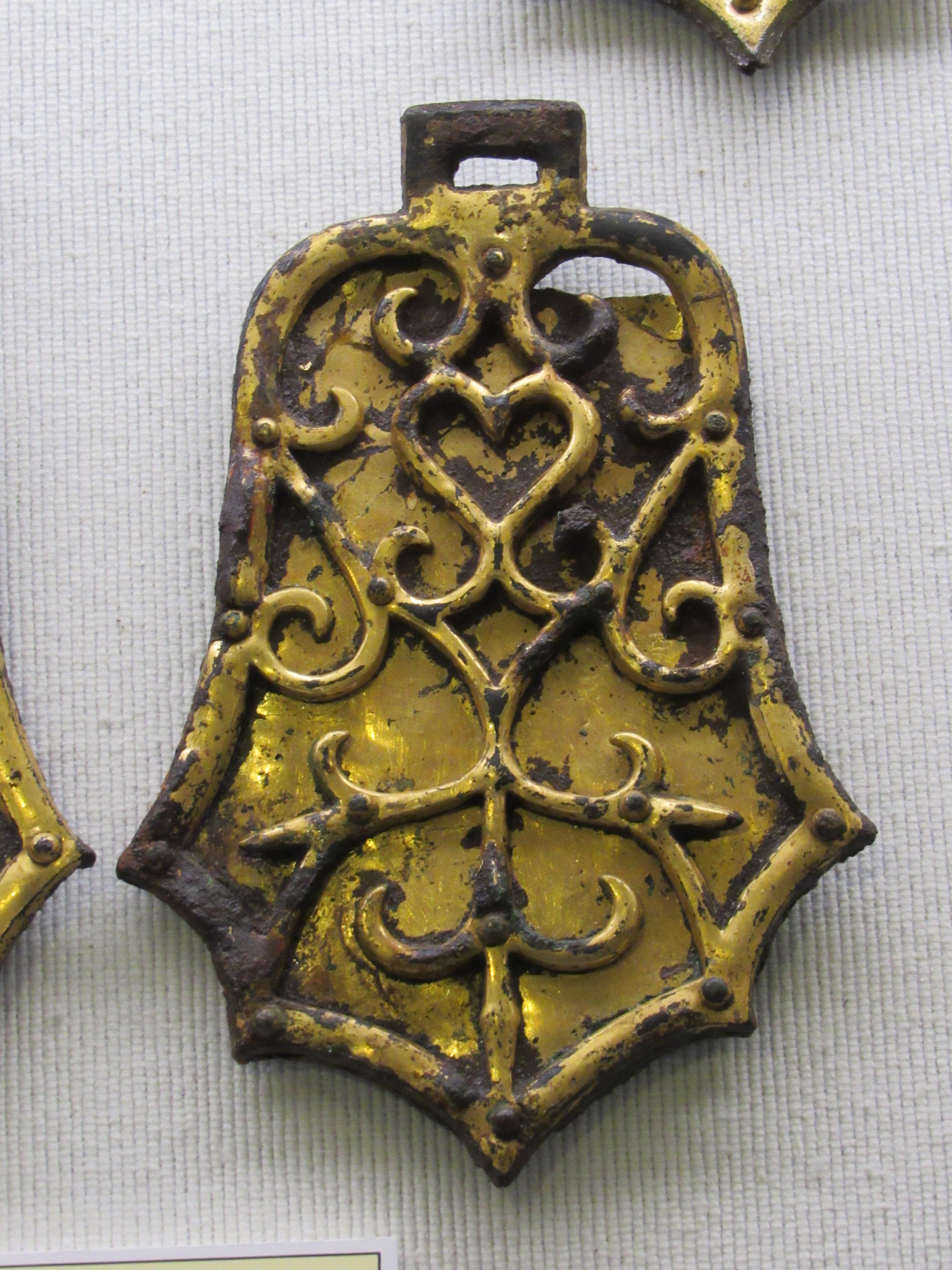
One of the harness pendants

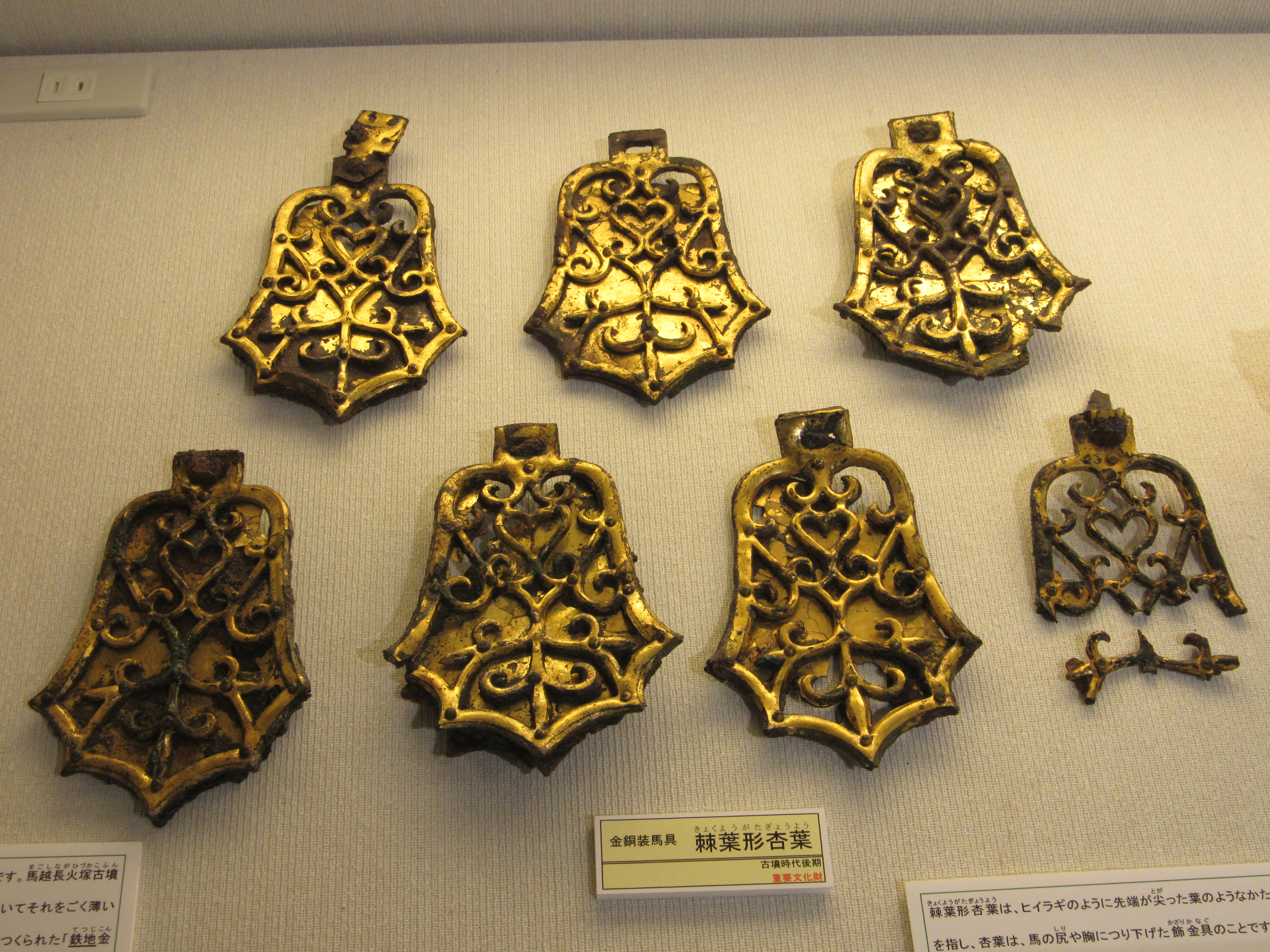
7 harness pendants

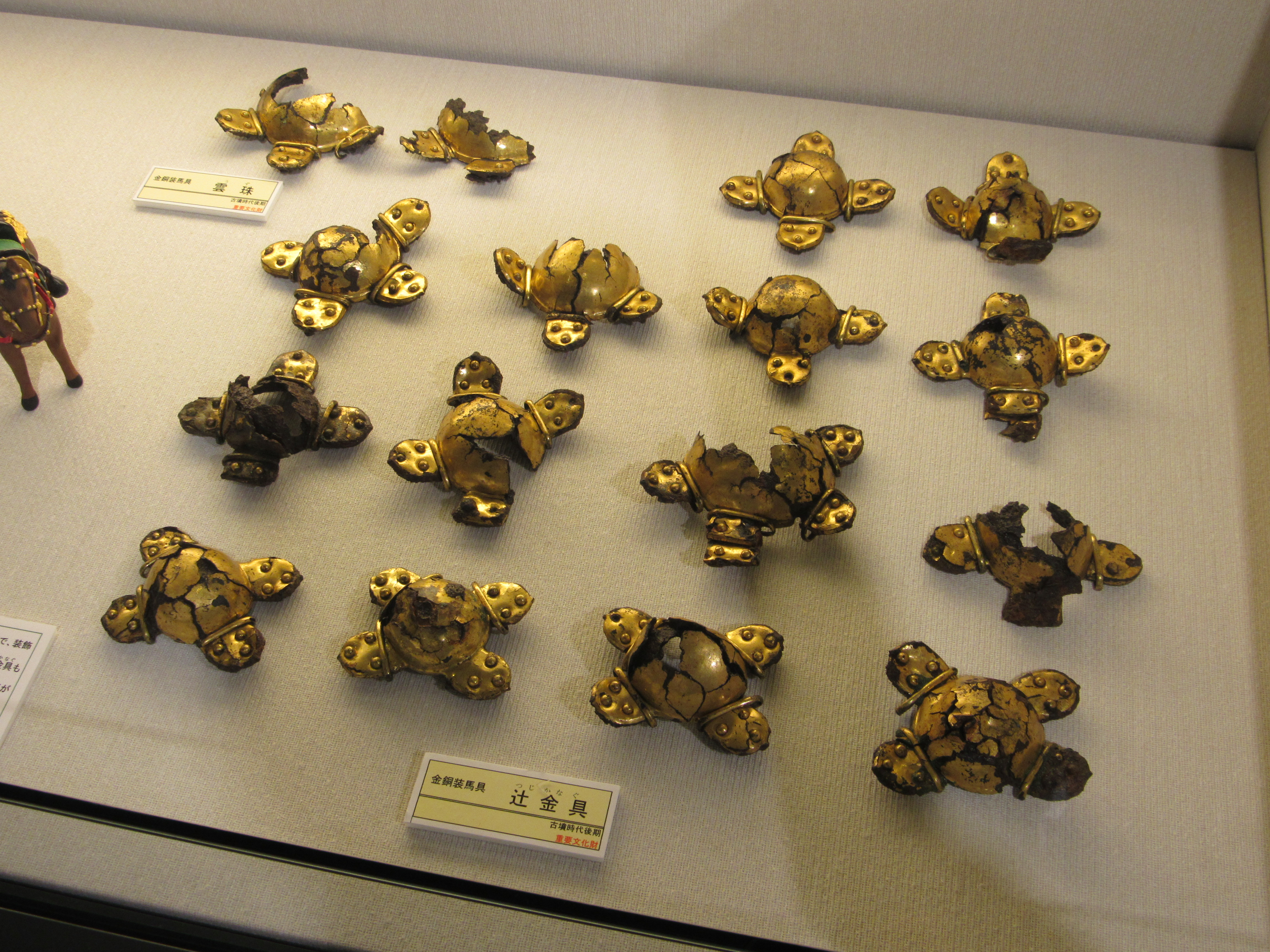
Harness fittings, etc.

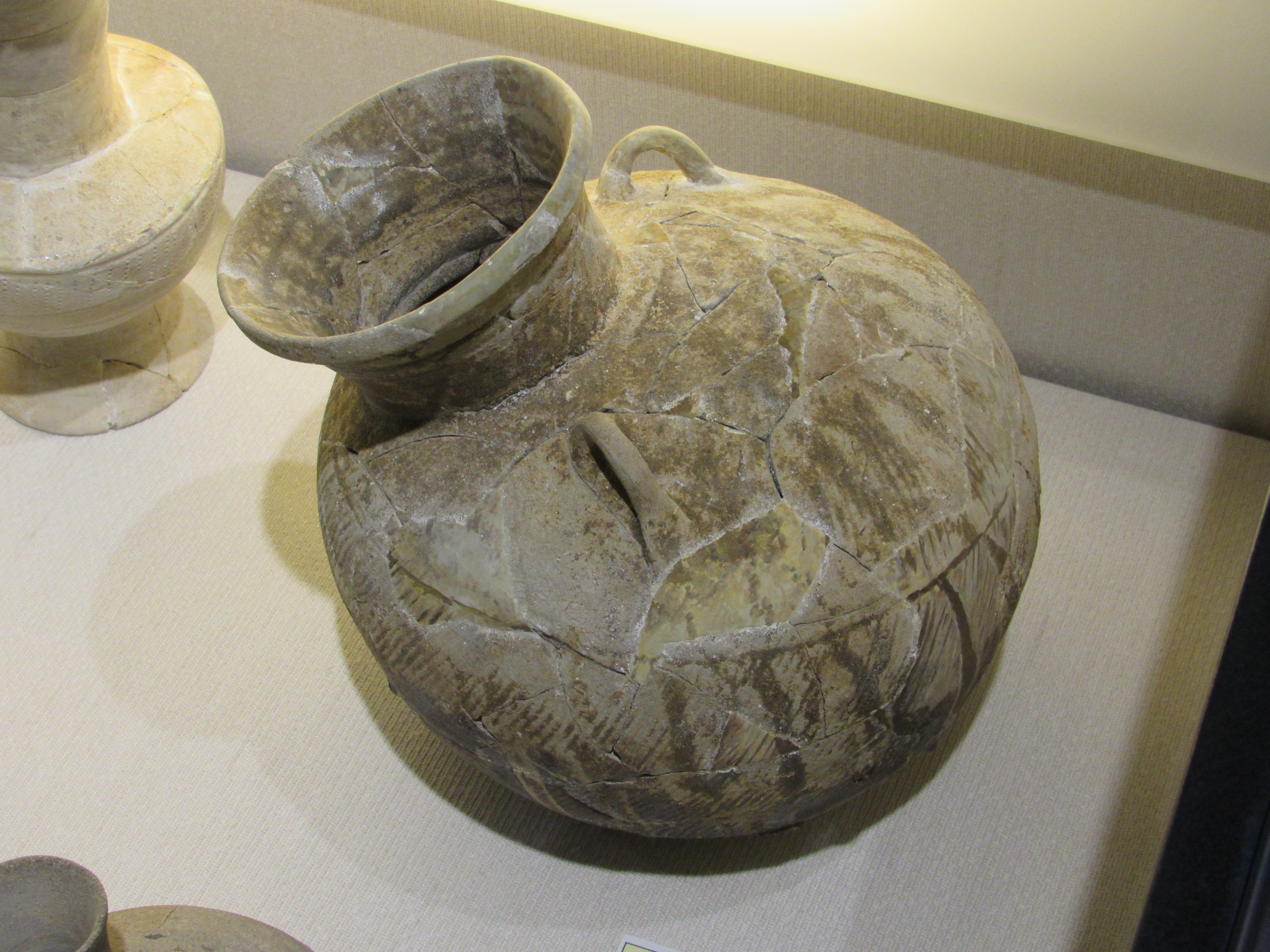
Sue ware pottery

== See also ==
- List of Historic Sites of Japan (Aichi)
