= List of historic sites of Japan (Aichi) =

This list is of the historic sites of Japan located within the Prefecture of Aichi.

== National Historic Sites ==
As of 29 February 2024, forty-one Sites in Aichi have been designated by the Japanese government's Agency for Cultural Affairs (of the Ministry of Education, Culture, Sports, Science and Technology) as being of national significance (including one *Special Historic Site).

Site	Municipality	Comments	Image	Coordinates	Type	Ref.
*Nagoya Castle 名古屋城跡 Nagoya-jō ato	Naka-ku, Nagoya	Edo period castle	Nagoya Castle	35°11′05″N 136°53′58″E	2	1422
Ano Ichirizuka 阿野一里塚 Ano ichirizuka	Toyoake	Edo period monuments on the Tōkaidō	Ano Ichirizuka	35°02′52″N 137°00′12″E	6	1431
Irago Tōdai-ji Tile Kiln ruins 伊良湖東大寺瓦窯跡 Irago Tōdaiji gayō-seki	Tahara	Kamakura period kiln ruins	Irago Tōdai-ji Tile Kiln	34°35′42″N 137°03′23″E	6	1452
Urigō ruins 瓜郷遺跡 Urigō iseki	Toyohashi	Yayoi period settlement trace	Urigō ruins	34°47′07″N 137°22′31″E	1	1449
Okehazama Battlefield site 桶狭間古戦場伝説地附戦人塚 Okehazama ko-senjō den setsuchi tsuketari sennintsuka	Toyohashi	Sengoku period battlefield relics	Okehazama Battlefield site	35°03′36″N 136°58′51″E	2, 7, 8	1432
Kaigarayama Shell Midden 貝殻山貝塚 Kaigarayama kaizuka	Kiyosu	Yayoi period midden & settlement trace	Kaigarayama Shell Midden	35°13′07″N 136°51′05″E	1	1456
Yoshigo Shell Midden 吉胡貝塚 Yoshigo kaizuka	Tahara	Jōmon period midden & settlement trace	Yoshigo Shell Midden	34°40′54″N 137°16′51″E	1	1445
Mikawa Kokubun-ji ruins 三河国分寺跡 Mikawa Kokubunji ato	Toyokawa	Nara period provincial temple of Mikawa Province	Mikawa Kokubun-ji	34°50′17″N 137°20′30″E	3	1404
Mikawa Kokubunni-ji ruins 三河国分尼寺跡 Mikawa Kokubunniji ato	Toyokawa	Nara period provincial nunnery of Mikawa Province	Mikawa Kokubunni-ji	34°50′26″N 137°20′41″E	3	1405
Shidami Kofun group 志段味古墳群 Shidami kofun-gun	Moriyama-ku, Nagoya	Kofun period tumuli cluster; designation comprises Shiratorizuka Kofun (白鳥塚古墳), Owaribe Jinja Kofun (尾張戸神社古墳), Naka-Yashiro Kofun (中社古墳), Minami-Yashiro Kofun (南社古墳), Shidami Ōtsuka Kofun (志段味大塚古墳), Kattezuka Kofun (勝手塚古墳), and Tōgokusan Shirotori Kofun (東谷山白鳥古墳)	Shidami Kofun group	35°15′19″N 137°02′40″E	1	1458
Mount Komaki 小牧山 Komakiyama	Komaki	Sengoku period castle ruins	Mount Komaki	35°17′33″N 136°54′46″E	2	1408
Matsudairagō sites 松平氏遺跡 Matsudaira-shi iseki	Toyota	Sengoku period origins of Matsudaira clan; designation includes Matsudaira Tōshō-gū, Matsudaira Castle, Ogyū Castle, Kōgetsu-in	Matsudaira village sites	35°03′02″N 137°15′52″E	2, 3	3248
Shingū ruins 真宮遺跡 Shingū iseki	Okazaki	Jōmon-Heian period settlement trace	Shingū ruins	34°47′07″N 137°22′31″E	1	1460
Susenoja cave 嵩山蛇穴 Susenoja ana	Toyohashi	Jōmon period cave dwelling	Susenoja cave	34°47′51″N 137°29′06″E	1	1451
Seto Kiln ruins 瀬戸窯跡 Seto kama ato	Seto	Muromachi-Edo period kiln ruins; designation comprises the Konagasō Pottery Kiln ruins (小長曽陶器窯跡) and Heiji Pottery Kiln ruins (瓶子陶器窯跡)	Seto Kiln ruins	35°13′05″N 137°09′48″E	6	1455
Shōbōji Kofun 正法寺古墳 Shōbōji kofun	Nishio	Kofun period tumulus	Shōbōji kofun	34°47′23″N 137°05′07″E	1	1429
Aotsuka Kofun 青塚古墳 Aotsuka Kofun	Inuyama	Kofun period tumulus	Aotsuka Kofun	35°19′34″N 136°55′45″E	1	1461
Ōarako Old Kiln ruins 大アラコ古窯跡 Ōarako ko-yōseki	Tahara	Heian-Kamakura period kiln ruins	Ōarako Kiln ruins	34°38′05″N 137°11′43″E	6	1454
Ōguruwa Shell Midden 大曲輪貝塚 Ōguruwa kaizuka	Mizuho-ku, Nagoya	Jōmon period midden & settlement trace	Ōguruwa Shell Midden	35°07′23″N 136°56′35″E	1	1440
Ōdaka Castle ruins 大高城跡 Ōdaka-jō ato	Midori-ku, Nagoya	Sengoku period castle ruins; designation includes the ruins of Marune-toride (丸根砦跡) and Washizu-toride (鷲津砦跡)	Ōdaka Castle	35°04′10″N 136°56′33″E	2	1436
Ōyama temple ruins 大山廃寺跡 Ōyama Haiji ato	Komaki	Nara-Heian period temple ruins	Ōyama temple ruins	35°19′20″N 137°00′20″E	3	1412
Ōhira Ichirizuka 大平一里塚 Ōhira ichirizuka	Okazaki	Edo period monuments on the Tōkaidō	Ōhira Ichirizuka	34°56′29″N 137°11′37″E	6	1434
Danpusan Kofun 断夫山古墳 Danpusan Kofun	Atsuta-ku, Nagoya	Kofun period tumulus	Danpusan Kofun	35°07′51″N 136°54′11″E	1	1462
Nagakute Battlefield site 長久手古戦場 Nagakute ko-senjō	Nagakute	Sengoku period battlefield site; designation includes Mount Mihata (御旗山), Mount Irogane (色金山), and the Kubizuka (首塚)	Nagakute Battlefield site	35°11′10″N 137°03′18″E	2, 7	1439
Nagashino Castle ruins 長篠城跡 Nagashino-jō ato	Shinshiro	Sengoku period castle ruins	Nagashino Castle ruins	34°55′21″N 137°33′34″E	2	1414
Shimabara Domain Fukōzu Matsudaira clan cemetery 島原藩深溝松平家墓所 Shimabara-han Fukōzu Matsudaira-ke bosho	Kōta	Daimyō cemetery at Honkō-ji (本光寺), the Fukōzu-Matsudaira clan bodaiji	Shimabara Fukōzu-Matsudaira clan cemetery	35°11′05″N 136°53′58″E	7	00003838
Higashinomiya Kofun 東之宮古墳 Higashinomiya Kofun	Inuyama	Kofun period tumulus	Higashinomiya Kofun	35°23′25″N 136°57′03″E	1	1459
Futago Kofun 二子古墳 Futago Kofun	Anjō	Kofun period tumulus	Futago Kofun	34°55′44″N 137°05′47″E	1	1409
Ajiyoshi Futagoyama Kofun 味美二子山古墳 Ajiyoshi Futagoyama Kofun	Kasugai	Kofun period tumulus	Ajiyoshi Futagoyama Kofun	35°13′33″N 136°56′12″E	1	1430
Irimi Shell Midden 入海貝塚 Irimi kaizuka	Higashiura	Jōmon period midden & settlement trace	Irimi Shell Midden	34°59′08″N 136°58′11″E	1	1448
Hachimanyama Kofun 八幡山古墳 Hachimanyama Kofun	Shōwa-ku, Nagoya	Kofun period tumulus	Hachimanyama Kofun	35°09′14″N 136°55′26″E	1	1418
Owari Kokubun-ji ruins 尾張国分寺跡 Owari Kokubunji ato	Inazawa	Nara period provincial temple of Owari Province	Owari Kokubun-ji	35°14′00″N 136°46′24″E	3	00003747
Himeogawa Kofun 姫小川古墳 Himeogawa Kofun	Anjō	Kofun period tumulus		34°54′56″N 137°05′44″E	1	1410
Dodo Sue Ware Kiln ruins 百々陶器窯跡 Dodo Sue-ki kama ato	Tahara	Heian to Kamakura period kiln ruins		34°38′43″N 137°17′57″E	6	1403
Tomida Ichirizuka 富田一里塚 Tomida ichirizuka	Ichinomiya	Edo period monuments on the Tōkaidō	Tomida Ichirizuka	35°17′45″N 136°44′30″E	6	1433
Maiki temple ruins Pagoda foundations 舞木廃寺塔跡 Maiki Haiji tō ato	Toyota	Nara period Buddhist temple ruins	Maiki temple ruins	35°08′44″N 137°10′11″E	3	1413
Kitano temple ruins 北野廃寺跡 Kitano Haiji ato	Okazaki	Nara period Buddhist temple ruins	Kitano temple ruins	34°59′26″N 137°08′24″E	3	1411
Honshō-ji precincts 本證寺境内 Honshō-ji keinai	Anjō	Sengoku period fortified Buddhist temple	Honshō-ji	34°54′01″N 137°05′07″E	3	00003895
Magoshi-Nagahizuka Kofun 馬越長火塚古墳 Magoshi-Nagahizuka Kofun	Toyohashi	Sengoku period fortified Buddhist temple	Magoshi-Nagahizuka Kofun	34°48′54″N 137°26′52″E	1	00003931
Inuyama Castle 犬山城跡 Magoshi-Nagahizuka Kofun	Inuyama	Sengoku/Edo period Castle	Inuyama Castle	35°23′14″N 136°56′22″E	1	00004024
Mikawa Provincial Capital Site 三河国府跡; Mikawa kokufu ato	Toyokawa			34°50′10″N 137°20′03″E		

== Prefectural Historic Sites ==
As of 1 May 2023, forty-three Sites have been designated by the prefectural government of Aichi as being of prefectural importance.

Site	Municipality	Comments	Image	Coordinates	Type	Ref.
Ono no Michikaze Legendary Birthplace 小野道風誕生伝説地; Ono no Michikaze tanjō den-setsuchi	Kasugai			35°13′11″N 136°58′04″E		
Daichi Site 大地遺跡; Daichi iseki	Iwakura			35°16′28″N 136°51′47″E		
Sumiyakibira Kofun Cluster 炭焼平古墳群; Sumiyakibira kofun-gun	Toyokawa			34°52′41″N 137°26′12″E		
Mamizuka Site 馬見塚遺跡; Mamizuka iseki	Ichinomiya			35°17′29″N 136°49′14″E		
Ōnedaira Site 大根平遺跡; Ōnedaira iseki	Shitara			35°10′08″N 137°37′44″E		
Takane Site 髙根遺跡; Takane iseki	Komaki			35°17′30″N 136°58′48″E		
Kurabune Site 鞍船遺跡; Kurabune iseki	Shitara			35°10′26″N 137°37′26″E		
Ōmidō-ji Site 史跡大御堂寺 shiseki Ōmidōji	Mihama	contains the grave of Minamoto no Yoshitomo		34°46′15″N 136°51′11″E		
Uri Castle Site 宇利城跡; Uri-jō ato	Shinshiro			34°51′55″N 137°31′47″E		
Ōdakayama Old Kiln 大髙山古窯; Ōdakayama ko-yō	Handa			34°55′44″N 136°56′50″E		
Iimori Castle ruins 飯盛城址; Iimori-jō shi	Toyota			35°07′57″N 137°18′58″E		
Kago Pond Old Kiln 籠池古窯; Kago-ike ko-yō	Tokoname			34°55′23″N 136°52′09″E		
Iwaba Kofun 岩場古墳; Iwaba kofun	Nishio			34°48′14″N 137°05′04″E		
Raigōji Ichirizuka 来迎寺一里塚; Raigōji Ichirizuka	Chiryū			35°00′06″N 137°04′13″E		
Asai Kofun Cluster 浅井古墳群; Asai kofun-gun	Ichinomiya			35°21′00″N 136°49′44″E		
Chōsenzuka Kofun 長泉塚古墳; Chōsenzuka kofun	Fusō			35°21′21″N 136°55′26″E		
Maeshiba Lighthouse 前芝の燈明台; Maeshiba no tōmyōdai	Toyohashi	19.8 m lighthouse built in 1669, in use until 1908, and restored in 1966 after damage in the Ise Bay Typhoon		34°46′49″N 137°20′07″E		
Shitara Castle ruins 設樂城跡; Shitara-jō ato	Tōei			35°04′48″N 137°41′18″E		
Iwazu No.1 Kofun 岩津第1号古墳; Iwazu daiichigō kofun	Okazaki			35°00′23″N 137°10′21″E		
West Kariya Jōmon Site 刈谷西部の縄文遺跡; Kariya seibu no Jōmon iseki	Kariya			34°59′55″N 136°59′40″E		
Sarayama Old Kilns 皿山古窯群; Sarayama ko-yō-gun	Tahara			34°36′14″N 137°06′05″E		
Okoshi-juku Ferry Site 起渡船場跡; Okoshi tosenba ato	Ichinomiya			35°18′37″N 136°44′12″E		
Yūfukuji Ichirizuka 祐福寺一里塚; Yūfukuji Ichirizuka	Tōgō			35°05′02″N 137°02′42″E		
Kemizuka 検見塚; Kemizuka	Kiyosu			35°13′07″N 136°51′05″E		
Toyota Ōtsuka Kofun 豊田大塚古墳; Toyota Ōtsuka kofun	Toyota			35°02′44″N 137°09′56″E		
Myōkō-ji Precinct 妙興寺境内地; Myōkōji keidai-chi	Ichinomiya			35°17′07″N 136°48′00″E		
Gongenyama Kofun 権現山古墳 (第一号墳/第二号墳); Gongenyama kofun	Toyohashi			34°48′51″N 137°26′02″E		
Ikawazu Shell Mound 伊川津貝塚; Ikawazu kaizuka	Tahara			34°38′44″N 137°08′53″E		
Kurozasa No.7 Kiln 黒笹七号窯; Kurozasa nanagō yō	Tōgō			35°07′06″N 137°05′16″E		
Shinmeigū No.1 Kofun 神明宮第1号古墳; Shinmeigū daiichi kofun	Okazaki			34°56′10″N 137°12′33″E		
Tayūzuka Kofun 太夫塚古墳; Tayūzuka kofun	Okazaki			34°54′53″N 137°09′11″E		
Jōhōji Kofun 城宝寺古墳; Jōhōji kofun	Tahara			34°40′03″N 137°16′04″E		
Myōkanji Kofun 妙感寺古墳; Myōkanji kofun	Inuyama			35°23′07″N 136°56′51″E		
Ikeda No.1 Kofun 池田第1号古墳; Ikeda daiichigō kofun	Toyota			35°09′35″N 137°10′25″E		
Hatagashirayama-One Kofun Cluster 旗頭山尾根古墳群; Hatagashirayama-One kofun-gun	Shinshiro			34°51′43″N 137°27′20″E		
Danjōyama Kofun 断上山古墳 (第9号古墳／第10号古墳); Danjōyama kofun	Shinshiro			34°55′00″N 137°31′24″E		
Kesadaira Site 今朝平遺跡; Kesadaira iseki	Toyota			35°08′20″N 137°19′34″E		
Hachiōji Shell Mound 八王子貝塚; Hachiōji kaizuka	Nishio			34°53′06″N 137°02′28″E		
Hakusan Jinja Kofun - Otabisho Kofun 白山神社古墳・御旅所古墳; Hakusan Jinja kofun・Otabisho kofun	Kasugai			35°13′37″N 136°56′07″E		
Karekinomiya Shell Mound 枯木宮貝塚; Karekinomiya kaizuka	Nishio			34°50′17″N 137°01′12″E		
Itayama-Nagane Old Kiln 板山長根古窯; Itayama-Nnagane ko-yō	Agui			34°56′23″N 136°56′29″E		
Utsunomiya Jinja Kofun 宇都宮神社古墳; Utsunomiya Jinja kofun	Komaki			35°16′46″N 136°53′46″E		
Kirahachimanyama Kofun 吉良八幡山古墳; Kirahachimanyama kofun	Nishio			34°50′45″N 137°05′03″E		

== Municipal Historic Sites ==
As of 1 May 2023, a further four hundred and fifty-two Sites have been designated by municipal governments in Aichi as being of municipal importance.

== See also ==
- Cultural Properties of Japan
- Owari Province
- Mikawa Province
- List of Places of Scenic Beauty of Japan (Aichi)
