= Ōyama temple ruins =

Archaeological site in Japan

- 大山廃寺跡
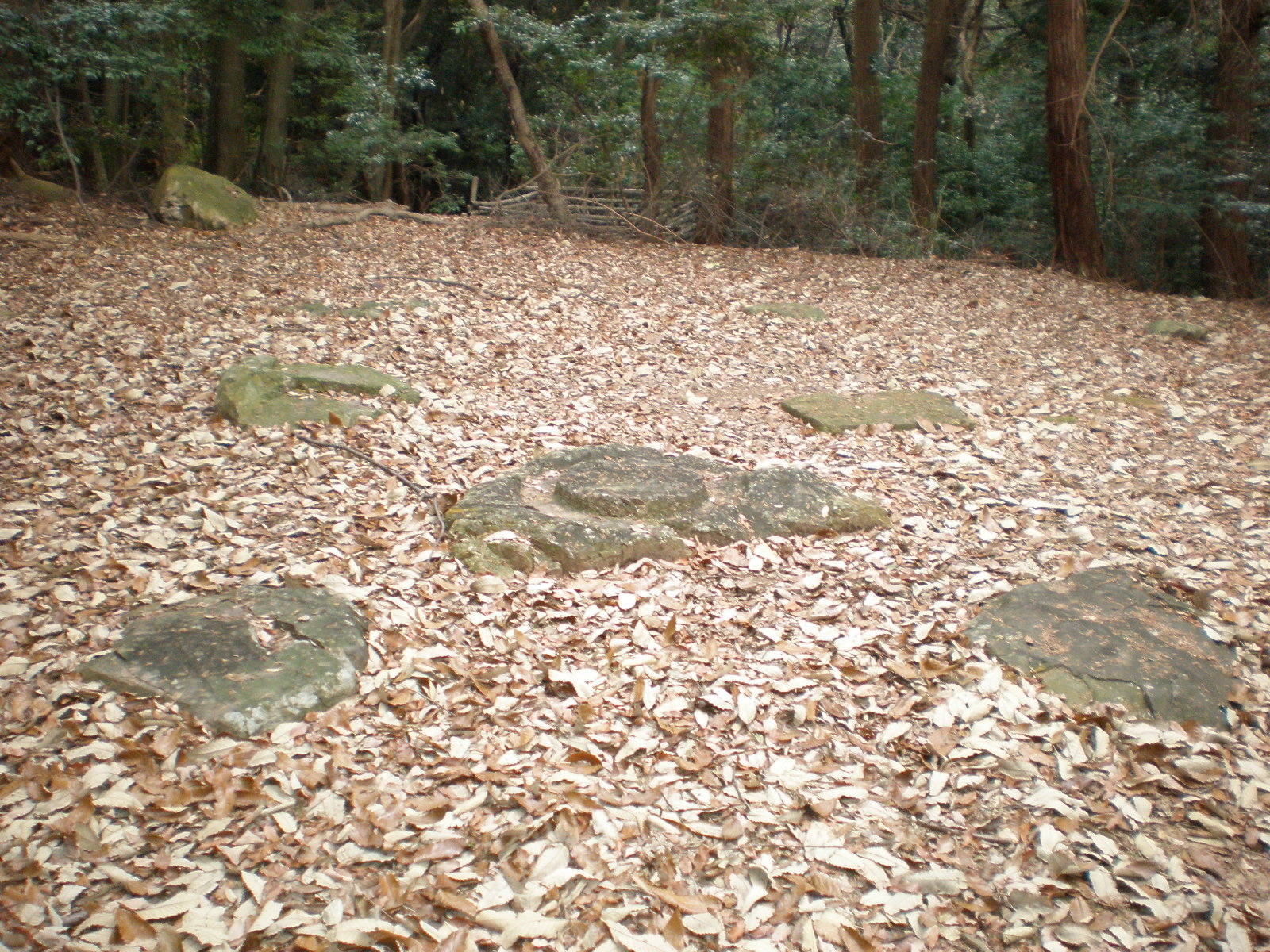
- Ōyama temple ruins

- Location within Aichi Prefecture Location within Japan

Religion
- Affiliation: Buddhist
- Status: ruins

Location
- Location: Komaki, Aichi
- Country: Japan
- Interactive map of Ōyama temple ruins
- Coordinates: 35°19′20″N 137°00′20″E

The Ōyama temple ruins (大山廃寺跡, Ōyama haji ato) is an archaeological site with the ruins of a Buddhist temple which existed from the Nara through Heian period, located in what is now the city of Komaki, Aichi, Japan. No remnant of the temple now exists except for some foundation stones, but the temple grounds were designated as a National Historic Site in 1929, with the area under protection expanded in 1980.

== Overview ==
The Ōyama temple ruins are located at an elevation of 200 meters in what is now northern Komaki city. A temple named Ōyamamine Shōfuku-ji (大山峰 正福寺) was founded in this location in the late 7th century. It became more popularly known as "Ōyama-dera" and was once of such size and importance that a saying arose that "In the west there is Enryaku-ji and in the east there is Ōyama-dera". During the 12th century, the temple became involved in the conflict between Enryaku-ji and Mii-dera, and sōhei from Mii-dera burned Ōyama-dera to the ground in 1152. The temple never recovered, and site was completely abandoned from the middle of the 14th century. In the Rinzai Zen temple of Kōgan-ji (大山峰 正福寺) was later founded at the foot of the mountain where Ōyama-dera was located, and claims to be its successor.

In 1928, the foundation stones of the pagoda of Ōyama-dera were discovered, along with the foundation stones for three other buildings from the Heian period and two buildings from the Kamakura period, along with a very large number of roof tiles from the Nara period onwards and ceramic shards. Many of these finds are exhibited and stored at the Komaki City History Museum (小牧市歴史館, Komaki-shi rekishi-kan). The site was proclaimed a National Historic Site the following year.

The site is located a 20-minute walk from the "Komaki Jinja-mae" bus stop on the bus from Komaki Station on the Meitetsu Komaki Line.

== See also ==
- List of Historic Sites of Japan (Aichi)
