= Hachimanyama Kofun (Nagoya) =

Kofun period burial mound in Nagoya, Tōkai, Japan

- 八幡山古墳 (Japanese)
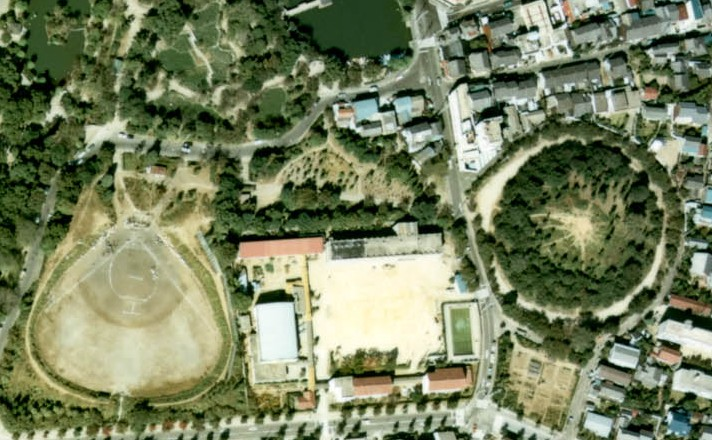
- Hachimanyama Kofun

- Hachimanyama Kofun Hachimanyama Kofun (Nagoya) (Japan)
- 35°09′14″N 136°55′26″E
- Type: Kofun
- Periods: Kofun period
- Location: Shōwa-ku, Nagoya, Japan
- Region: Tōkai region

History
- Built: 5th century AD

Site notes
- Public access: No

The Hachimanyama Kofun (八幡山古墳) is a large Kofun period burial mound in the Yamawaki neighborhood of Shōwa Ward in the city of Nagoya, Aichi Prefecture. Dating from the mid-fifth century, it is the largest circular kofun in the Tōkai region of Japan. The tumulus was designated as a National Historic Site in 1931.

== Overview ==
The Hachimanyama Kofun is a large circular (empun (円墳)) tumulus, with a diameter of 82 meters and height of 10 meters. It was once surrounded by a 10-meter wide moat, which is now filled in. It is one of the largest circular burial mounds in the Tōkai region, and built in the middle of the 5th century AD. The name "Hachimanyama" came from a small Shinto shrine, the Hachiman Jinja, which was once located on its summit. This kofun is the largest and only survivor of a group of tumuli which once existed in the area. It was incorporated into Tsurumai Park in 1919, at which time the tumulus was recorded as being covered with a thick grove of pine trees. During World War II, the site was seized by the Imperial Japanese Army, and the summit was flattened for use as the location of an anti-aircraft battery. After the war, the mound was remodeled by the city of Nagoya, and trees were replanted; however, no archaeological excavation was made and the site was fenced off with public access prohibited. Per pre-war records, numerous haniwa had been recovered from the site, including some in the shape of human figures, but these were lost in the war and their present whereabouts (or even if they still survive) is unknown.

The kofun is located about 8 minutes on foot from JR Central Chūō Main Line Tsurumai Station.

== See also ==
- List of Historic Sites of Japan (Aichi)
