= Susenoja cave =

Ancient site in the Tōkai region, Japan

Susenoja Cave
- 嵩山蛇穴 (Japanese)
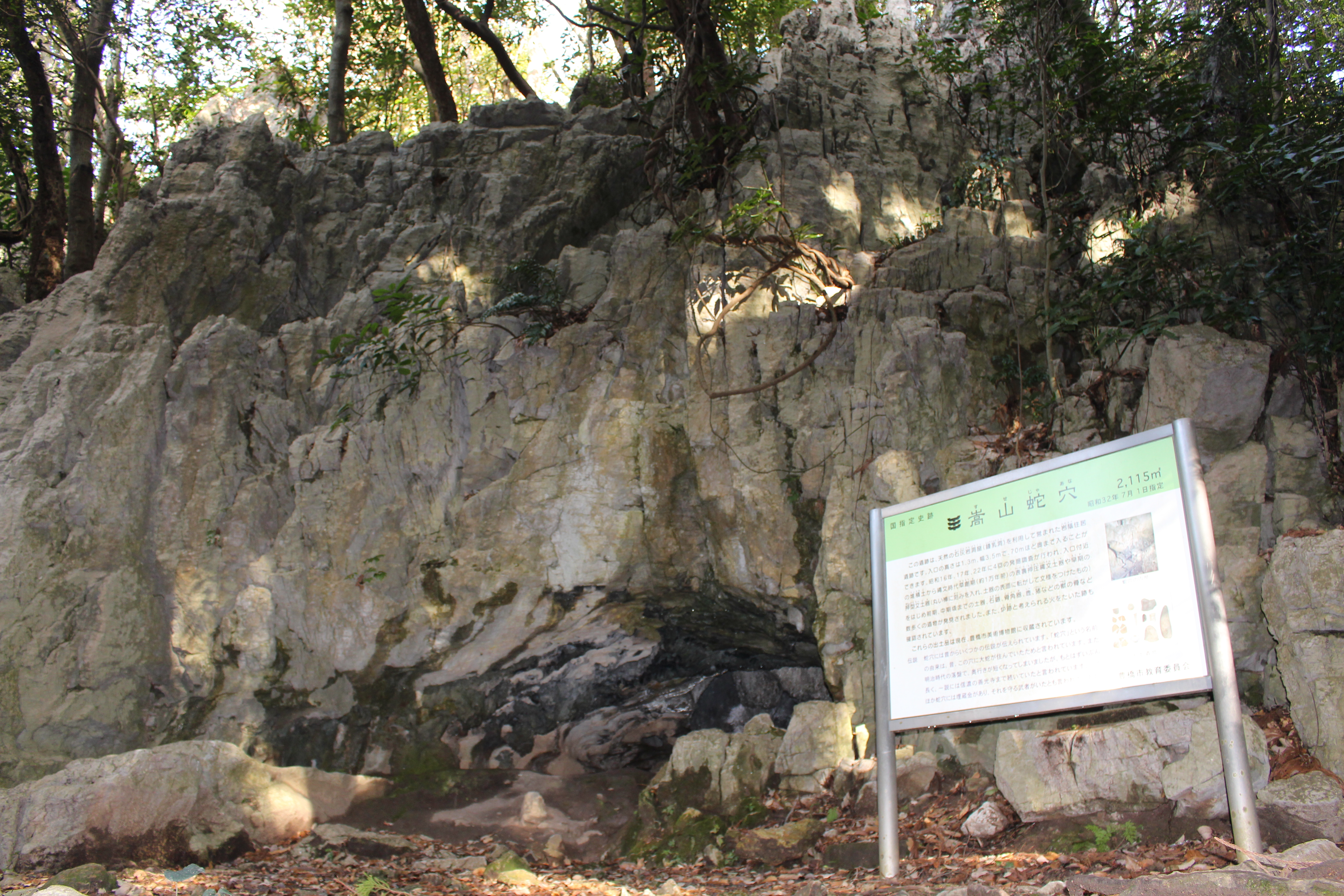
- Susenoja Cave

- Susenoja Cave Susenoja cave (Japan)
- 34°47′51″N 137°29′06″E
- Type: settlement trace
- Periods: Jōmon period
- Location: Toyohashi, Aichi, Japan
- Region: Tōkai region

Site notes
- Public access: Yes (no facilities)

The Susenoja Cave (嵩山蛇穴, Susenoja ana) is an archaeological site containing a ruins of a cave dwelling which was inhabited in the early Jōmon period (10,000 BC to 4000 BC), located in the Susecho neighborhood of the city of Toyohashi, Aichi in the Tōkai region of Japan. It was designated a National Historic Site of Japan in 1957.

== Overview ==
The Susenoja Cave is a natural limestone cave located on a hillside at an elevation of 140 meters, and is approximately 300 meters from Japan National Route 362 between downtown Toyohashi and the town of Mikkabi in neighboring Shizuoka Prefecture. The cave has a height of about 1.3 meters at the entrance, with a wide interior, and a depth of about 70 meters. It forms a natural rock shelter on an ancient thoroughfare through the Honsaka Pass connecting what would later become Mikawa and Tōtōmi Provinces. Archaeological excavations were conducted four times from 1965 to 1922, and traces of people living around the entrance were discovered. Artifacts excavated include Jōmon pottery with pressed designs, stone tools and bone needles, as well as animal and fish bones and shells, dating from the early though the middle Jōmon period. There is also the trace of what appears to have been a hearth.

The cave is the subject of numerous legends, including a legend that it extended to a tunnel leading all the way to Zenkō-ji in Nagano Prefecture. Other legends refer to buried gold guarded by a giant snake or supernatural warriors. The site is a ten-minute walk from the "Kakuyama" bus stop on the Toyotetsu Bus from Toyohashi Station, but there are no public facilities.

== See also ==
- List of Historic Sites of Japan (Aichi)
