= Ogyū Castle =

- 大給城
- Toyota, Aichi, Japan
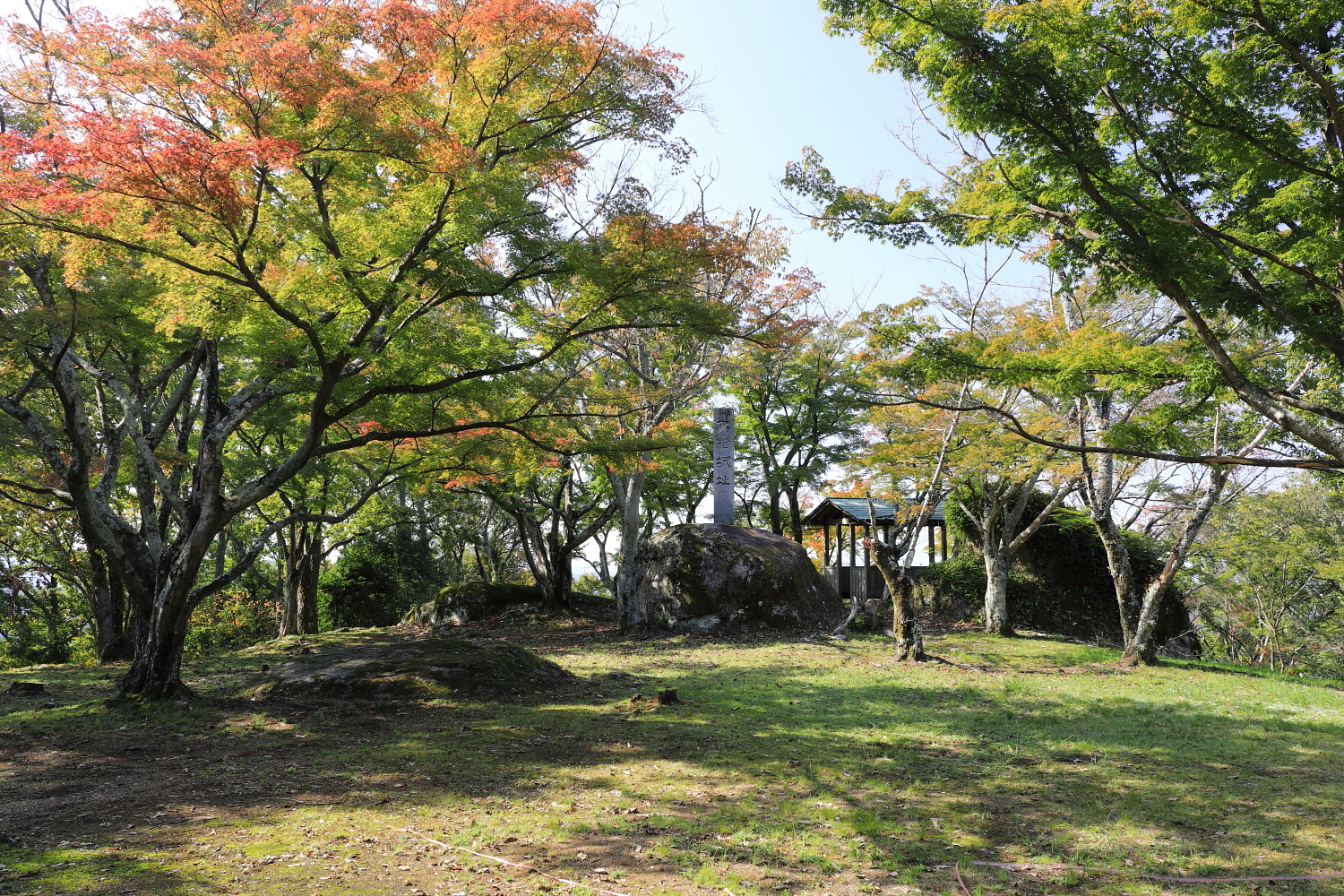
- Ruins of Ogyū Castle

Site information
- Type: yamajiro-style Japanese castle
- Open to the public: park
- Condition: Ruins

Location
- Ogyū Castle Ogyū Castle (Japan)
- Coordinates: 35°03′12.51″N 137°13′39.77″E

Site history
- Built: Muromachi period
- In use: Sengoku period

Ogyū Castle (大給城, Ogyū-jō) was a Sengoku period flatland-style Japanese castle located in the Ōuchi neighborhood of the city of Toyota, Aichi in the Tōkai region of Japan. The ruins, together with other sites in Matsudaira-gō associated with the Matsudaira clan, have been collectively protected as a National Historic Site since 2000.

== Background ==
Ogyū Castle is located approximately six kilometers east of the center of modern Toyota city. It is situated on a small hill overlooking the crossing point of modern Japan National Route 301 with a road connecting the area with the city of Okazaki. The hill, named "Shiroyama" has an elevation of approximately 100 meters and is covered with huge boulders, The castle spreads east-to-west across the ridge of the mountain, incorporating these boulders into its defenses. The castle consists of two large enclosures separated by walls, with major gates also reinforced by stone walls. However, these walls are not made of dressed stone, but simply of naturally flat stones piled up. At the edge of the central enclosure is a large stone with post holes in its upper surface. This may have been the location of a yagura watchtower. On the northern slope of the hill is a well and reservoir, also protected by stone walls, and on the southern side of the hill is a terrace, which held the main residence. The total size of the castle is approximately 280 by 220 meters.

The origins of Ogyū Castle is unknown. Matsudaira Nobumitsu (1404–1488) captured it from local warlord Nagasaki Shinzaemon, His grandson, Matsudaira Norimoto (1446–1537) established the Ogyū-Matsudaira cadet branch of the clan, and substantially remodeled the fortifications from 1507 to 1510. The Ogyū-Matsudaira were one of 18 cadet branches of the Matsudaira clan. These branches were often in conflict with each other, and the castle was ruined in a battle in 1575 with the rival Takiwaki-Matsudaira clan. The Ogyū-Matsudaira remained supporters of the main Matsudaira line, and eventually Tokugawa Ieyasu. When Tokugawa Ieyasu was relocated by Toyotomi Hideyoshi to the Kantō region in 1590, the Ogyū-Matsudaira were assigned a new fief in Kōzuke Province and Ogyū Castle was abandoned.

The site now consists of remnants of stone walls on a forested hillside, preserved as a park with hiking trails. The tomb of Matsudaira Norimoto is located at the eastern end of the ridge that continues from Ogyū Castle. The site is located approximately 20 minutes by car from the Toyota-Matsudaira interchange on the Tōkai-Kanjō Expressway.

== Gallery ==
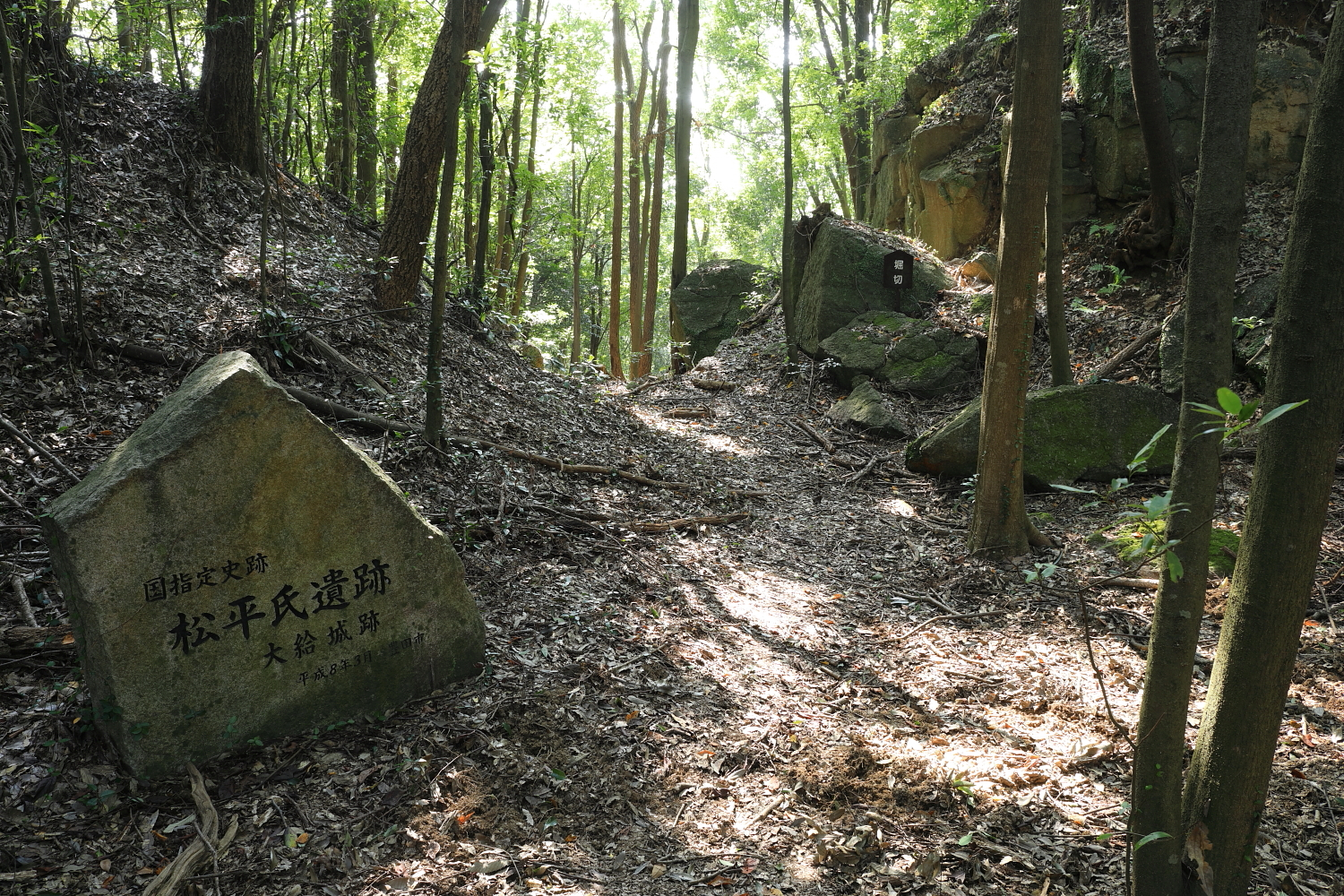
Monument and remnants of moat

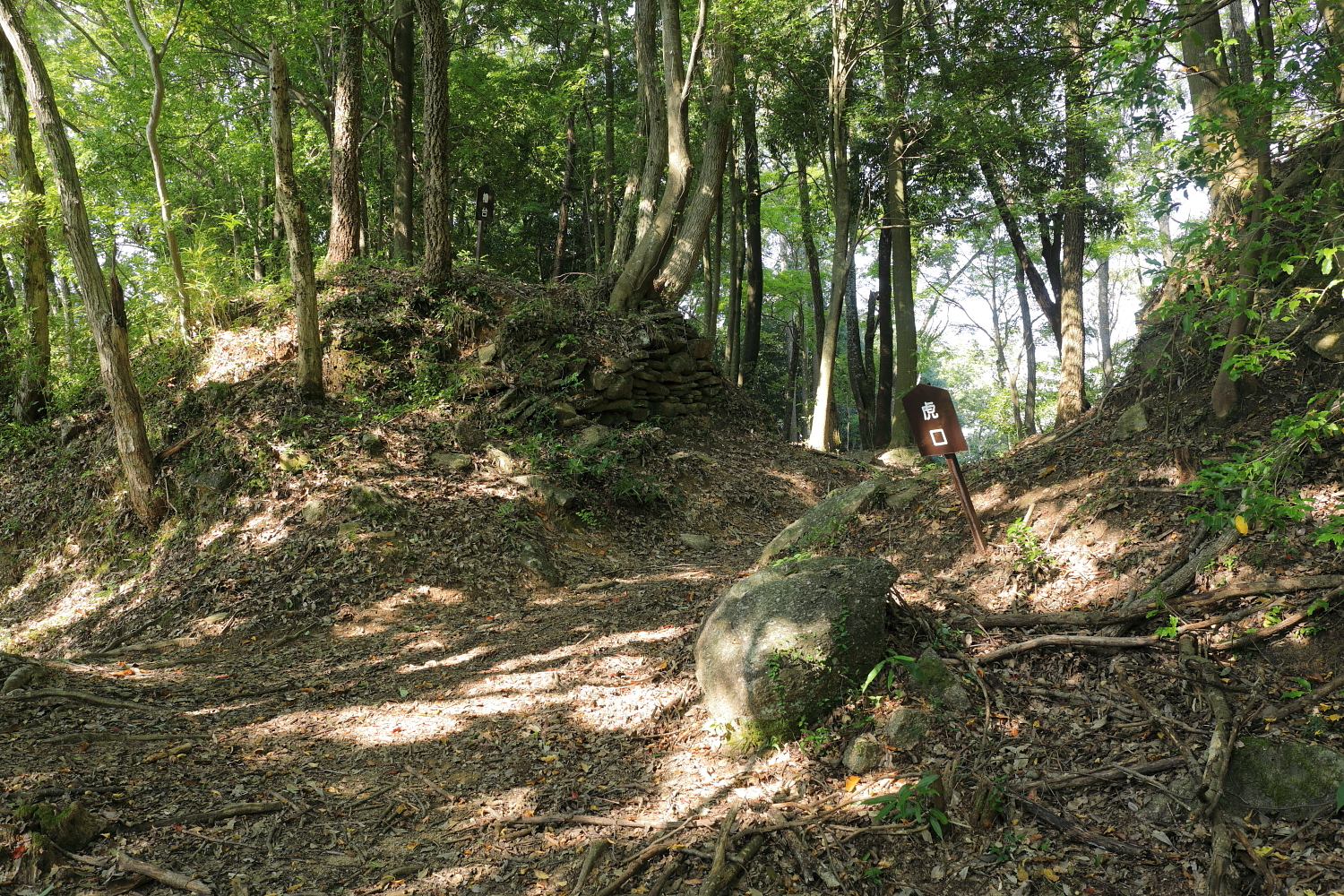
ruins of a gate

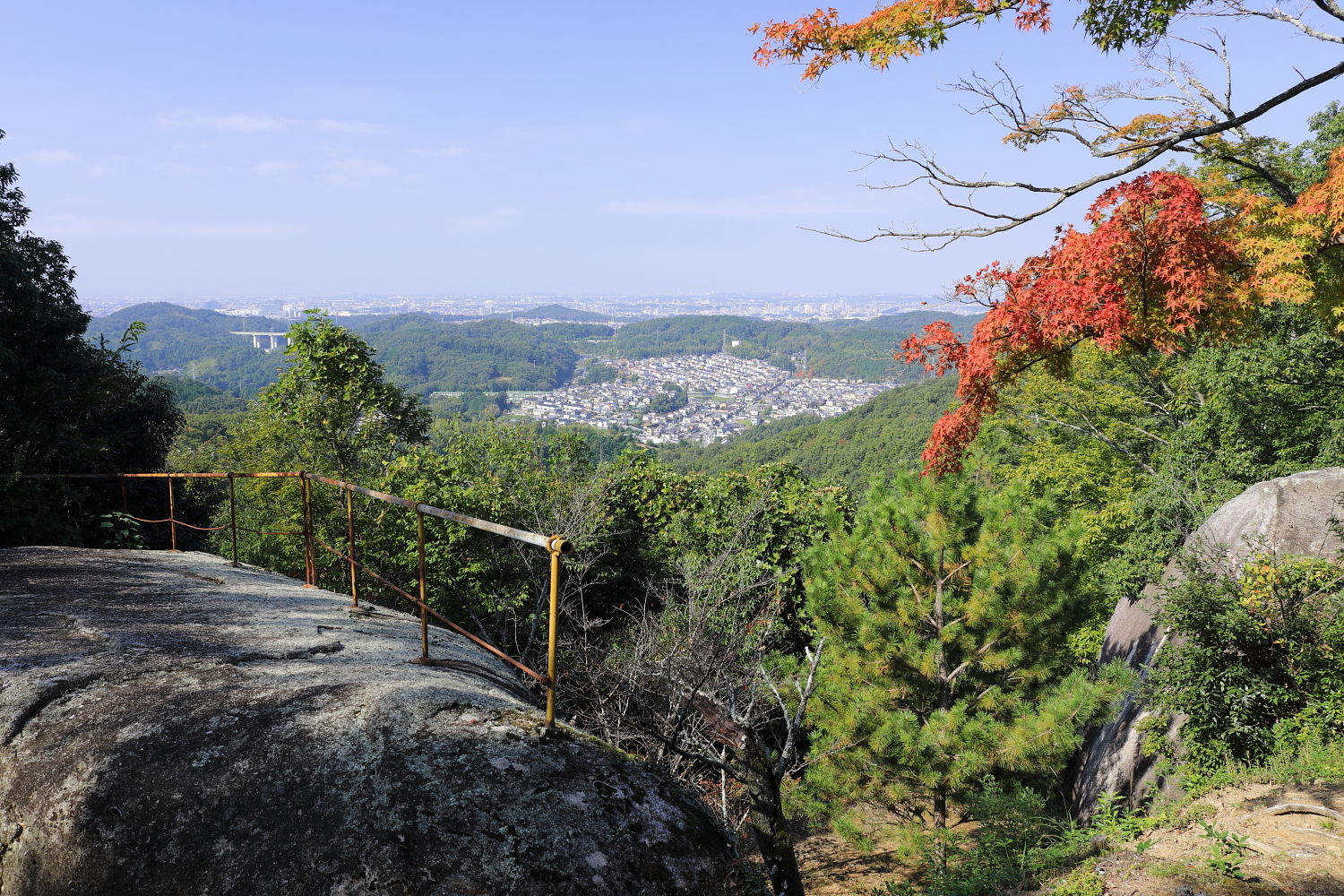
view from the castle

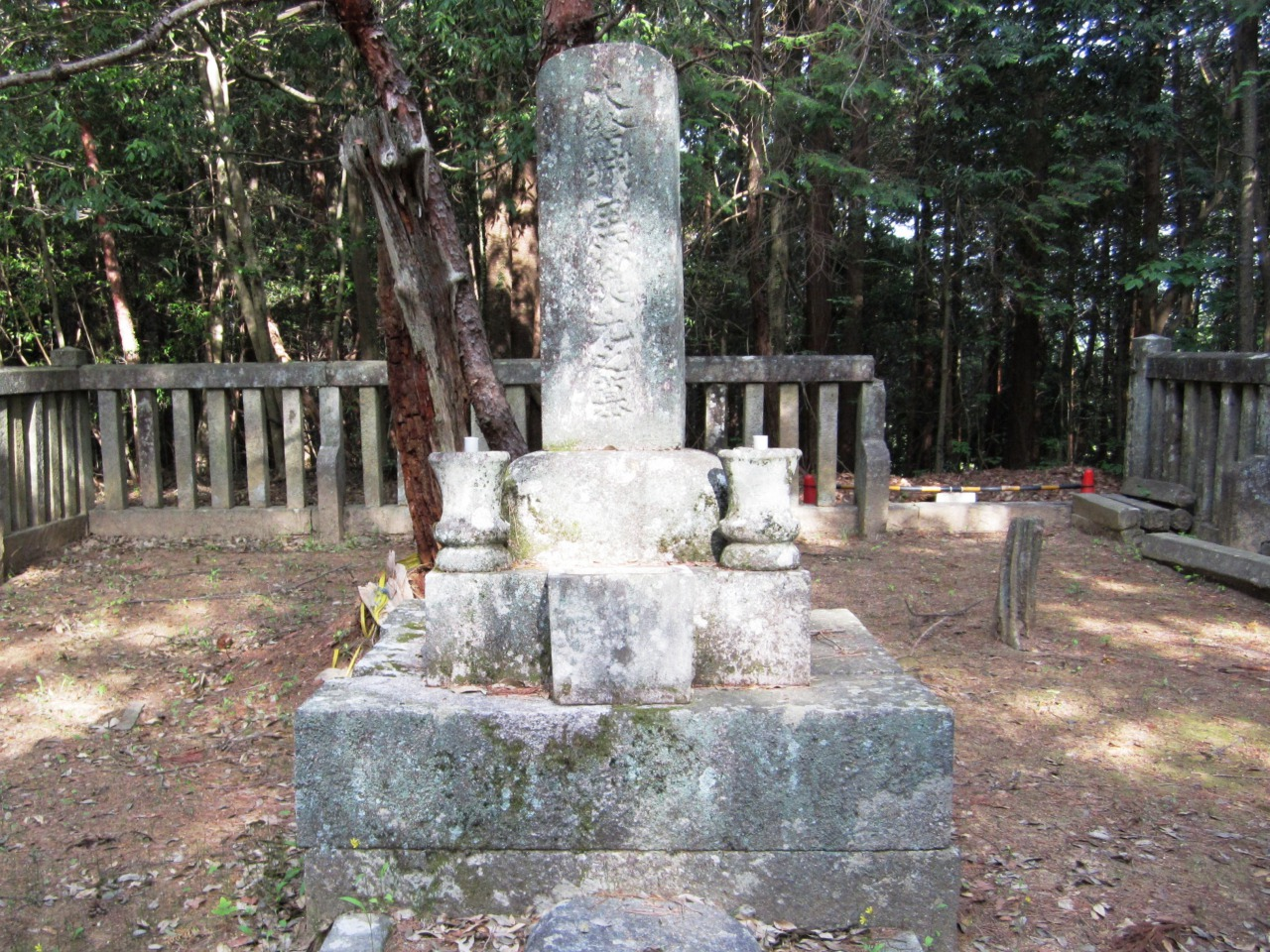
Matsudaira Norimoto's Grave

== See also ==
- List of Historic Sites of Japan (Aichi)
