= Honshō-ji =

Buddhist temple in Aichi Prefecture, Japan

- 本證寺
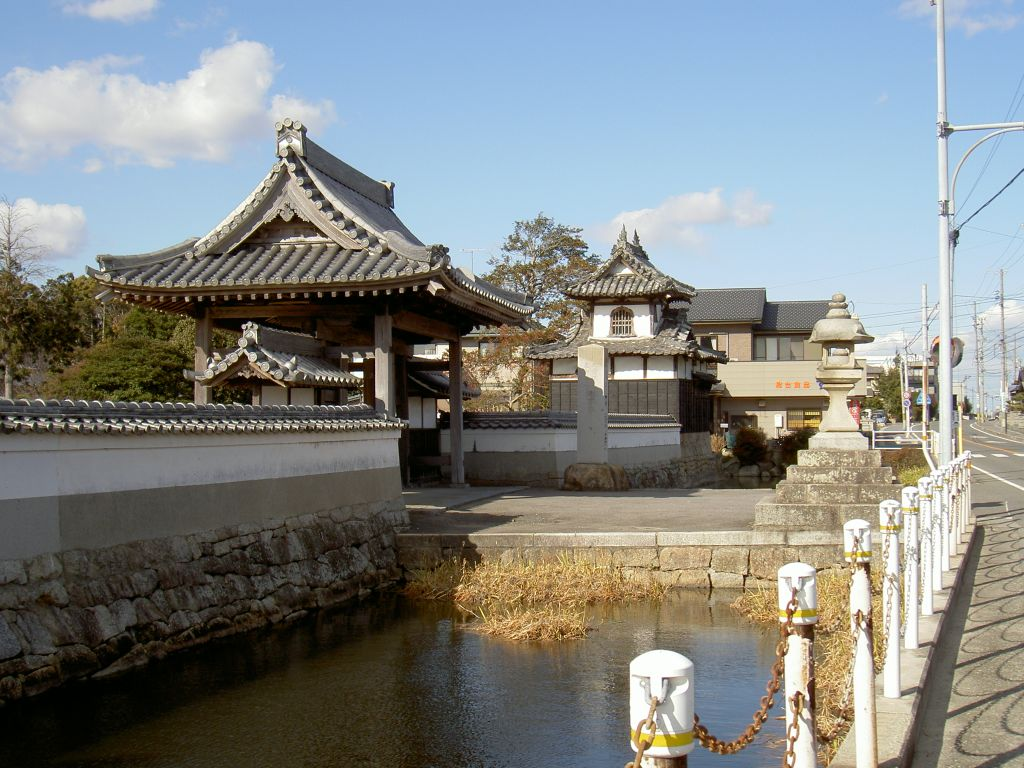
- Moat and Gaste of Honshō-ji

- Honshō-ji Honshō-ji (Japan)

Religion
- Affiliation: Buddhism
- Deity: Amida Nyōrai
- Rite: Ōtani-ha Jōdo Shinshū

Location
- Location: 26 Nodera, Nodera-cho, Anjō-shi, Aichi-ken 444-1165
- Country: Japan
- Coordinates: 34°54′01″N 137°05′07″E

Architecture
- Founder: Kyouen
- Completed: 1206 AD

Website
- www.asahi-net.or.jp/~qb2t-nkns/honsyouji.htm

Honshō-ji (本證寺) is a Buddhist temple of the Ōtani-ha Jōdo Shinshū sect in the city of Anjō, Aichi Prefecture, Japan. Its main image is a statue of Amida Nyōrai. It is a rare surviving example of a fortified temple/monastery from the Sengoku period and as such, the temple grounds have been designated as Historic Site of Japanin 2016. The temple is also known as the Nodera Gohon-bō (野寺御本坊).

== History ==
Honshō-ji is located southeast of the downtown area of modern Anjō. The temple was founded in 1206 by Kyouen, a disciple of Shinran and became one of the main strongholds of the Ikkō-ikki movement in Mikawa Province. This movement overthrew the secular authority of the shugo and local landlords and attempted to rule the province as a semi-theocratic republic, drawing widespread support from overtaxed peasants and the lower ranks of the samurai. The temple was fortified in the manner of a flatland-style Japanese castle with a double concentric moat, high walls, and yagura-style towers in the corners, which were used as drum-towers or belfries.

In 1549, Honshō-ji had 115 samurai under its banners and was a major military force in the province, together with Shōman-ji (勝鬘寺) and Jōgū-ji (上宮寺). However, the movement drew the ire of Tokugawa Ieyasu, who crushed it in a series of military campaigns culminating in the Battle of Azukizaka in 1564.

The temple fell into disrepair after that date, and was abandoned for a century, when it was revived by order of Shogun Tokugawa Ietsuna in 1663 as a temple to pray for the prosperity of the Tokugawa clan. Throughout the Edo period it enjoyed the patronage of the Owari-Tokugawa family. Many of the surviving buildings of the temple date from the Edo period and are protected as Aichi Prefectural Important Cultural properties. These include the Main Hall (1663), Bell tower (1703), Drum Tower (1760), Sutra Library (1823), and Gates (approximately 1700). The outer moat has been buried under modern urban development, and about half of the inner moat remains.

== Cultural properties ==
Honshō-ji has two paintings from the Kamakura period which are registered as Important Cultural Properties of Japan. One is a depiction of Shotoku Taishi and another is a depiction of the honzon statues of Zenko-ji.

== Gallery ==
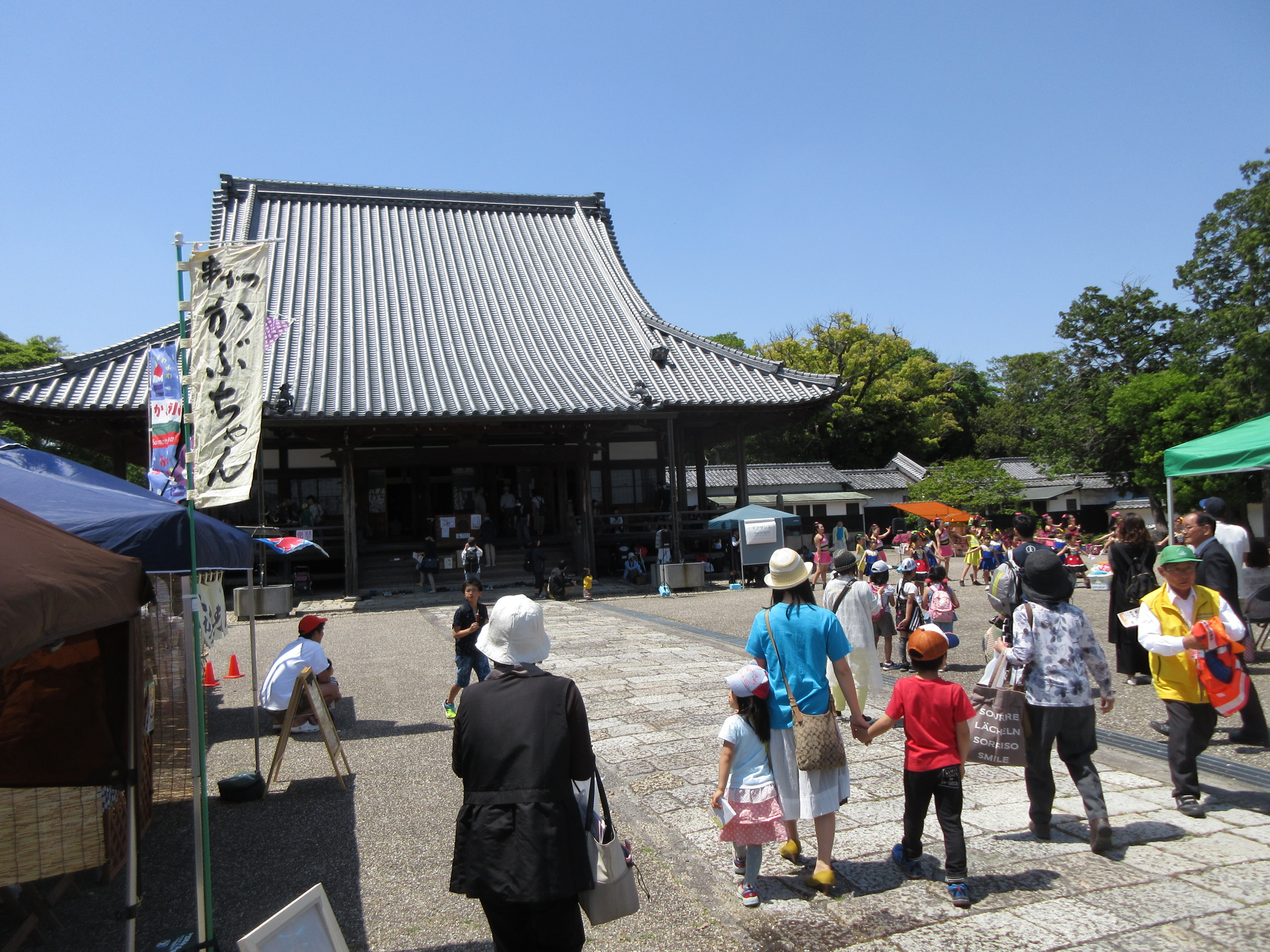
Hondō

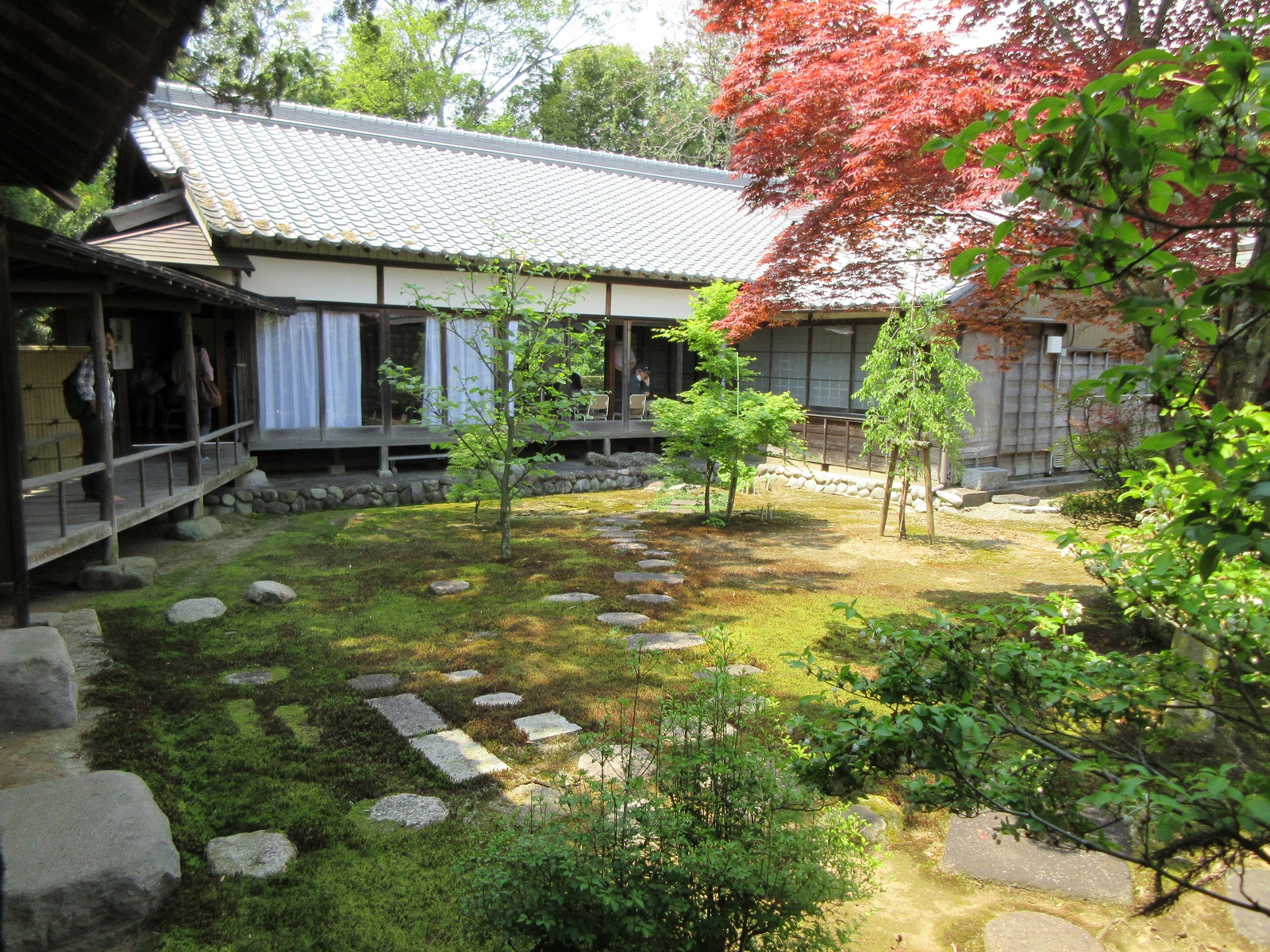
Gardens

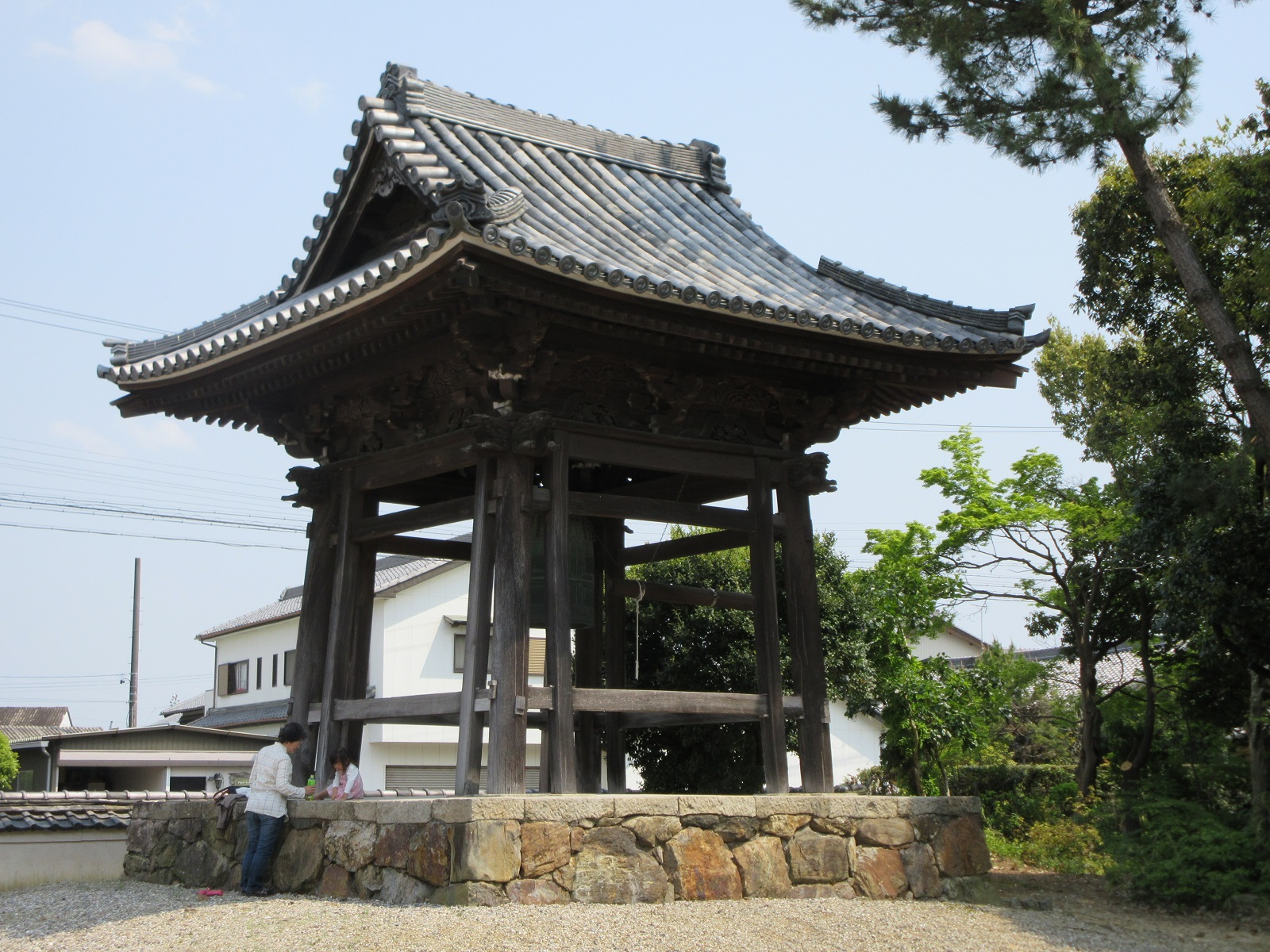
Belfry

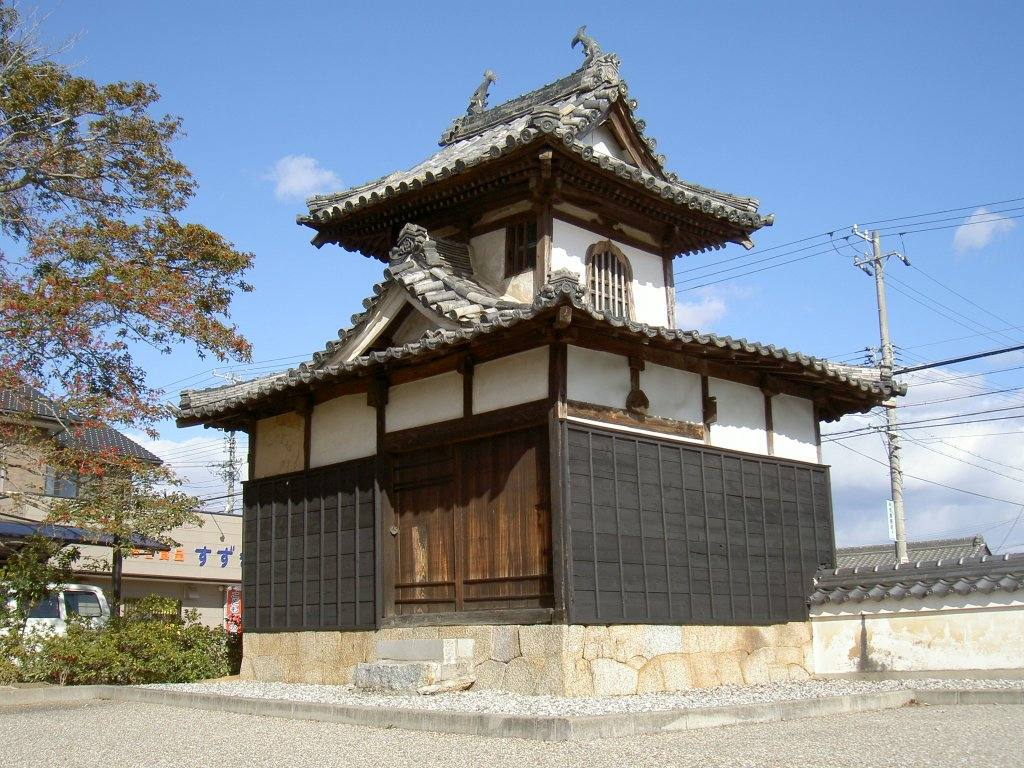
Drum Tower

== See also ==
- List of Historic Sites of Japan (Aichi)
