= Higashinomiya Kofun =

Kofun period burial mound in Inuyama, Japan

- 東之宮古墳 (Japanese)
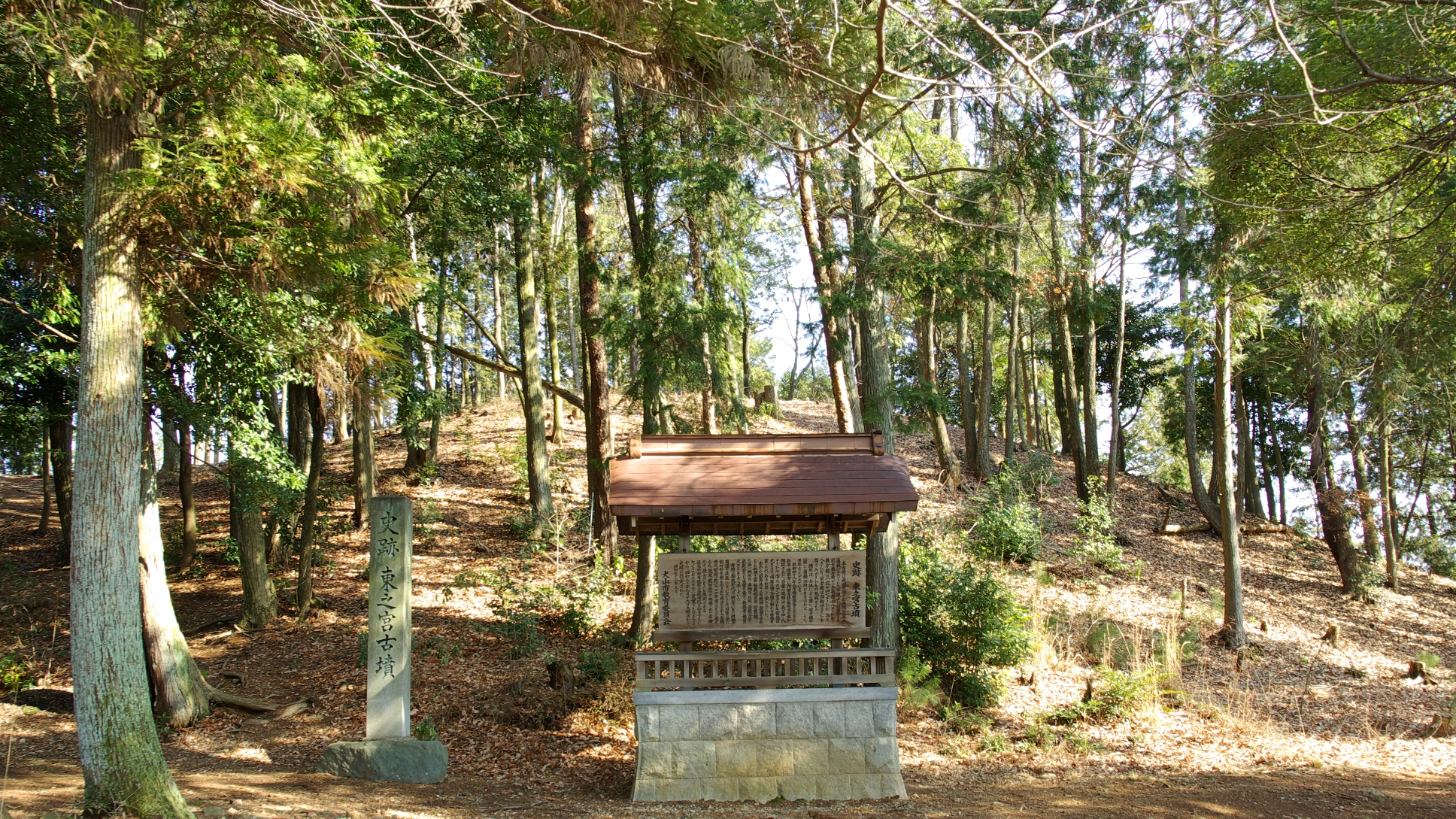
- Higashinomiya Kofun

- Higashinomiya Kofun Higashinomiya Kofun (Japan)
- 35°23′25″N 136°57′03″E
- Type: Kofun
- Periods: Kofun period
- Location: Inuyama, Aichi, Japan
- Region: Tōkai region

Site notes
- Public access: Yes (no public facilities)

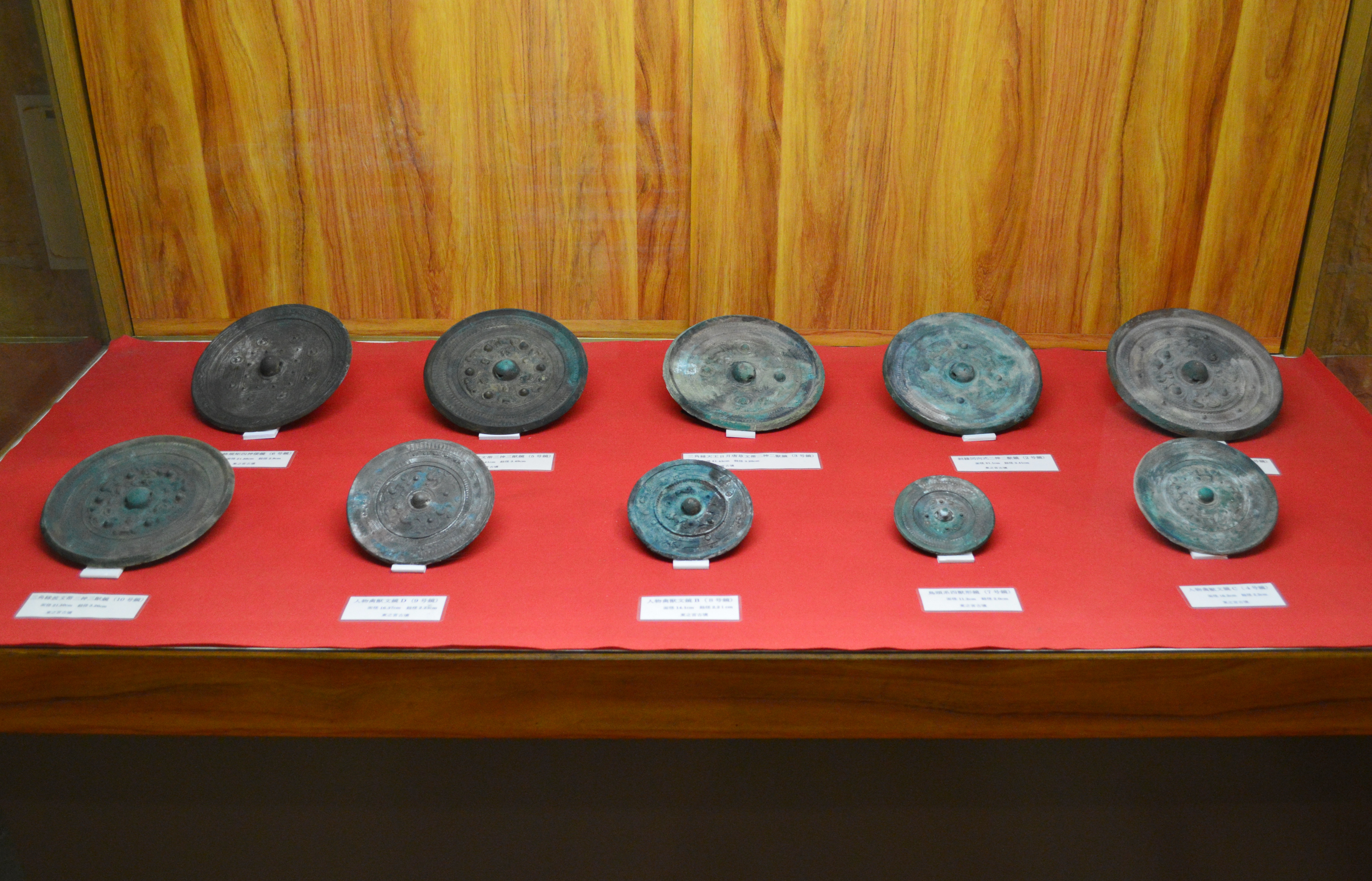
Bronze mirrors recovered from the Higashinomiya Kofun

The Higashinomiya Kofun (東之宮古墳) is a Kofun period burial mound, located in what is now part of the city of Inuyama, Aichi in the Tōkai region of Japan. It was designated a National Historic Site of Japan in 1975.

== Overview ==
The Higashinomiya Kofun is a "two conjoined rectangles" typed (zenpō-kōhō-fun (前方後方墳)), located at the northwest end of the Aki Hills on the left bank of the Kiso River in the northeast of Inuyama city. Built by cutting away a natural hill with an elevation of 143 meters, it has a typical keyhole-shaped form and a view of the Owari Plain. The tumulus is 72 meters long, with a posterior portion 48 x 49 meters with an eight-meter height, and an anterior portion of 43 x 43 meters, with a six-meter height. It was orientated facing northwest.

The tumulus has two burial chambers, one in the posterior and one in the anterior portion, both parallel to the main axis of the burial mound. Since the posterior portion was broken into and partially destroyed by grave robbers, an emergency archaeological excavation was conducted by the Inuyama City Board of Education in 1973. A vertical-type stone chamber with a gravel floor was found, with the surfaces of the walls and ceiling covered in clay and painted in vermillion. Many grave goods were recovered, including eleven ancient bronze mirrors, magatama and cylindrical beads, jade balls, wheel-shaped stones, iron implements (including swords, daggers, spears and agricultural implements) and a cracked bamboo-shaped sarcophagus. From these grave goods, it was estimated that the kofun dates from the late 3rd to early 4th century, making it one of the earliest in Owari Province. All of the excavated items were designated as Important Cultural Properties of Japan in 1978 and are now stored at the Kyoto National Museum.

From 2005 to 2007, another excavation survey was carried out by the Inuyama City Board of Education for historic site maintenance, and it was determined that the mound was constructed in two tiers and was originally covered in fukiishi. The total length was extended to 78 meters.

The kofun is located 15 minutes on foot from Inuyama Yuen Station on the Meitetsu Kakamigahara Line.

== See also ==
- List of Historic Sites of Japan (Aichi)
