= Konagasō Pottery Kiln ruins =

Japanese archaeological site

Konagasō kiln ruins
- 小長曽陶器窯跡 (Japanese)
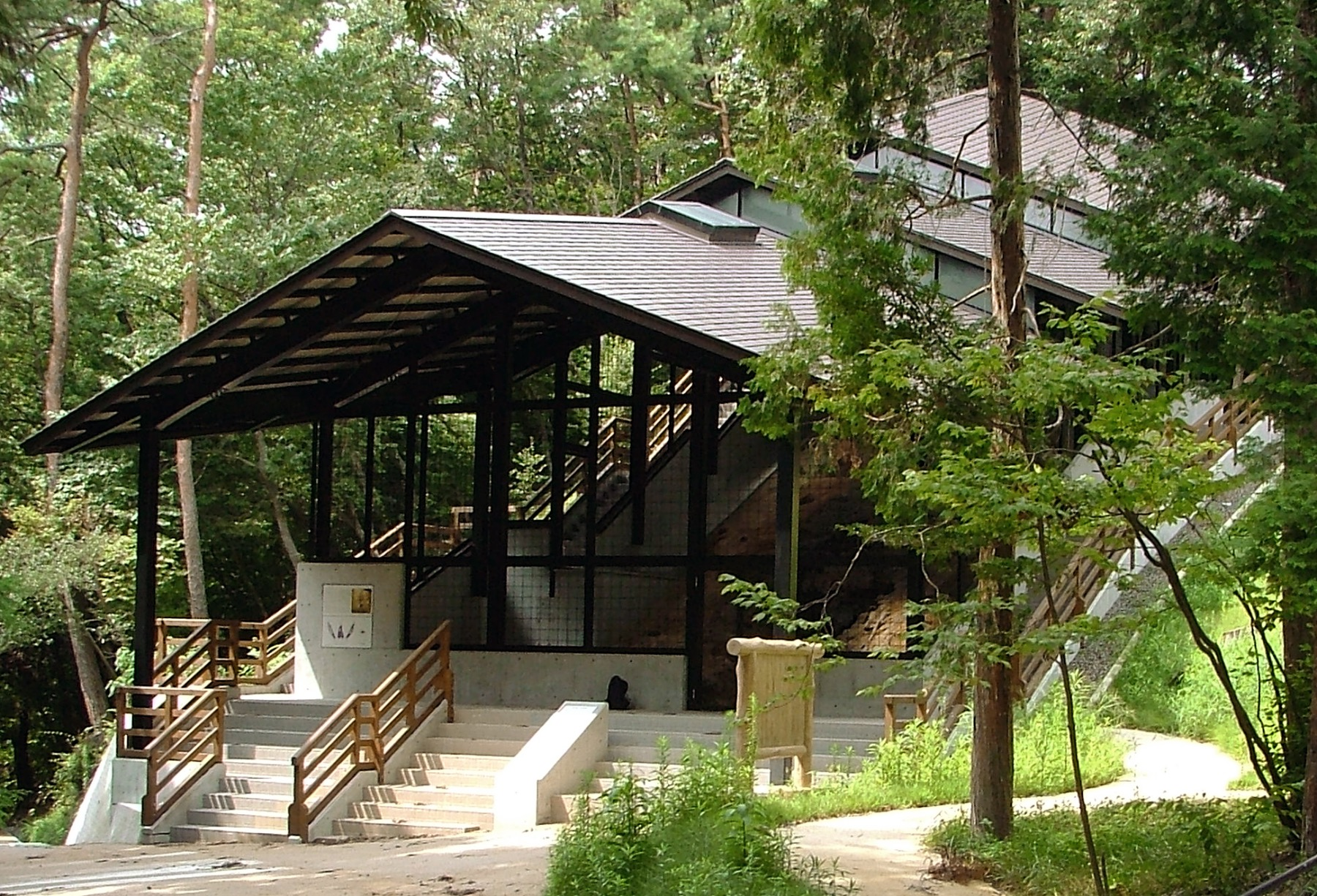
- Konagasō kiln ruins

- Konagasō kiln ruins Konagasō Pottery Kiln ruins (Japan)
- 35°13′05″N 137°09′48″E
- Type: kiln ruins
- Periods: Muromachi period
- Location: Seto, Aichi, Japan
- Region: Tōkai region

Site notes
- Area: 1,509 m^{2} (16,240 sq ft)
- Public access: Yes (no facilities)

The Konagasō kiln ruins (小長曽陶器窯跡, Konagasō tōki kama ato) is an archaeological site containing a Muromachi period kiln located in the Higashishirasaka neighborhood of the city of Seto, Aichi in the Tōkai region of Japan. The site was designated a National Historic Site of Japan in 1971. with the area under protection expanded in 2002.

== Overview ==
Located in the hills of eastern Seto, this kiln was built in the Muromachi period and is recorded as having been in use until the early modern era. Some 800 kiln ruins have been discovered around the city of Seto, which for centuries has been one of the major pottery production sites in Japan, and of these 800 kilns, some 100 date from the "old Seto" period. The Konagasō kiln is one of the best-preserved of these kiln ruins, as most have been destroyed or vandalized over the years. The ruins were known since the Edo period and in 1946 this was the first kiln site to be excavated by the Japan Ceramic Association.

Excavations have found that the kiln is an anagama-style kiln with semi-underground structure utilizing the natural slope of the hill. It has a total length of 6.7 meters and maximum width of three meters, and is divided into three parts. The firing chamber and combustion chamber are connected by a barrier with six holes located along its bottom. The use of such through-holes is very rare for old Seto kilns. This kiln is considered a predecessor for the later noborigama-style design.

A large number of shards of Seto ware were discovered in the ash and debris in front of the kiln and were found to be from a wide variety of jars, vases and other objects. The pottery shards were found to be mostly without pattern. Subsequent archaeological excavations have confirmed the remains of a workshop and a large ash field that spreads around the kiln, creating a slope. The site is thus of great significance in understanding the production technology, equipment, and worker organization for early Seto pottery. A structure with a barrier and five stanchions in the center of the kiln is unique. Tea utensils such as tea bowls from the Edo period and kiln tools for producing them have been excavated from a narrow area in front of the kiln's opening and have been dated to the end of the 17th century and 18th century . This shows that the medieval kiln was modified and reused during the Edo Period.

The kiln ruins are located about 30 minutes on foot from the "Unkouji" bus stop on the Meitetsu Bus from Owari Seto Station on the Meitetsu Seto Line.

== See also ==
- List of Historic Sites of Japan (Aichi)
