= Kitano temple ruins =

Archaeological site in present-day Okazaki, Japan

- 北野廃寺跡
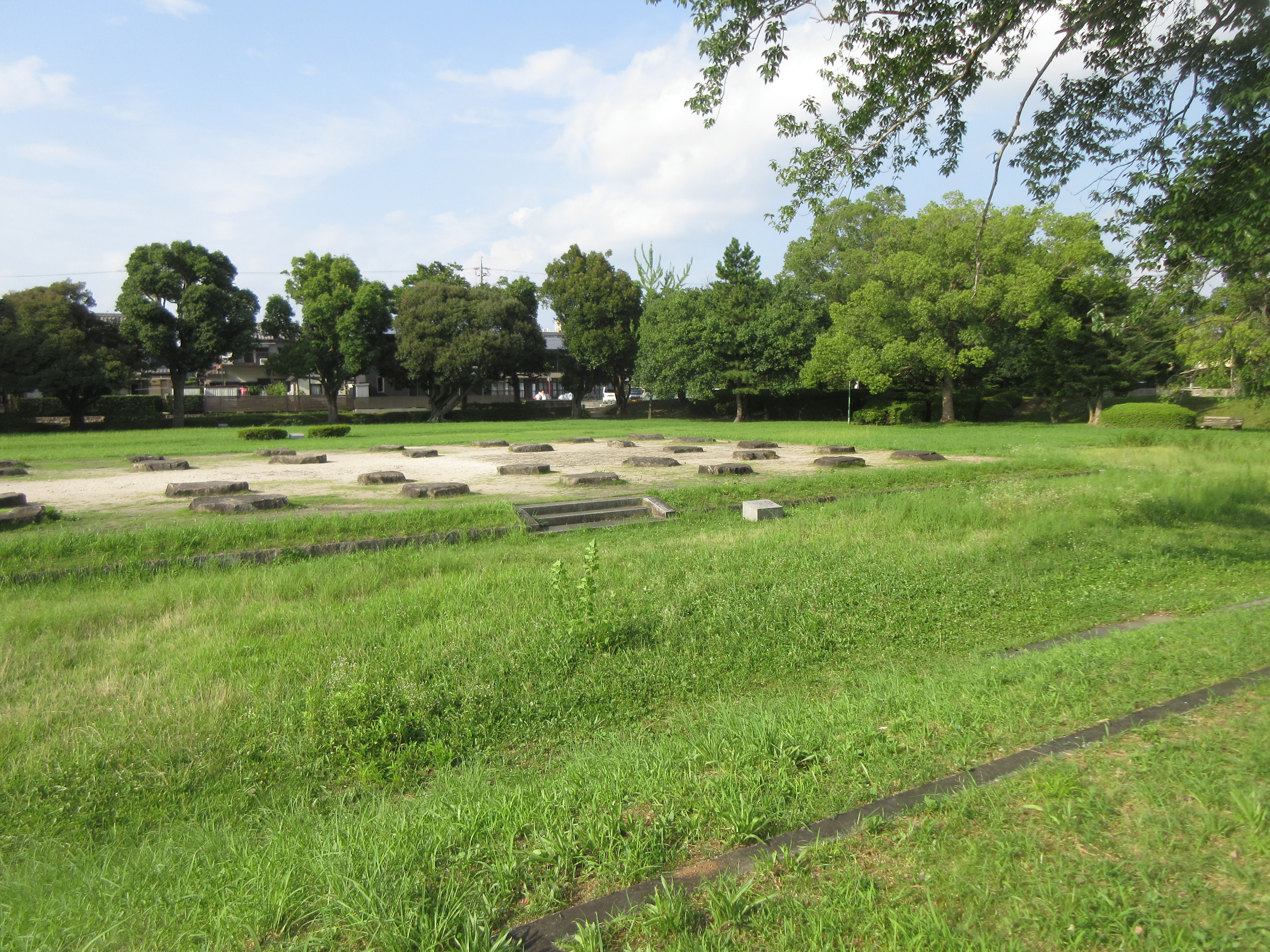
- Ruins of the Main Hall at the Kitano temple ruins

- Location within Aichi Prefecture Location within Japan

Religion
- Affiliation: Buddhist
- Status: ruins

Location
- Location: Okazaki, Aichi
- Country: Japan
- Coordinates: 34°59′26″N 137°08′24″E

The Kitano temple ruins (北野廃寺跡, Kitao haji ato) is an archaeological site with the ruins of an Asuka period Buddhist temple located in what is now the city of Okazaki, Aichi, Japan. The actual name of the temple is unknown, and no structures of the original temple exists, but the temple grounds were designated as a National Historic Site in 1929, with the area under protection expanded in 1988.

== Overview ==
The site is located on the southeastern edge of the Hekikai Plateau on the right bank of the Yahagi River. The ruins date from the 7th century and are believed to be the oldest temple ruins in Aichi Prefecture, although the name of the temple does not appear in any known historical records. The precincts cover an area of 126.5 meters from east-to-west and 140 meters from north-to-south.

An archaeological excavation conducted in 1964 related to the development of a park found the foundations of a pagoda, the Lecture Hall, and fragments other structures, including the Middle Gate and South Gate. The condition of many of these foundations was very poor, so in many causes the exact size and position of the buildings could only be estimated, but the layout was similar to that of Shitenno-ji in Osaka, with the pagoda in a direct line with the South Gate, and in front of the Main Hall, instead of to one side. The entire compound was surrounded by an earthen wall.

From the size of the foundations, the height of the pagoda can be estimated to be 11.35 meters, or roughly the same size as the pagoda at Hōryū-ji in Nara. The Kondō was 15.3 meters by 12.2 meters, and the Lecture Hall was 30.15 meters by 16.25 meters, and there was an eight by four bay hall. Later excavations uncovered the foundations for a cloister and the residence of the monks.

Excavated artifacts included roof tiles, tile towers, iron nails, Sue ware pottery, ash-glazed pottery, and fragments of Buddhist statuary. The style of roof tiles appears strongly influenced by Goguryeo, and is unique to the area. One of the artifacts found was a bronze casket decorated similar to one found at the Shōsōin in Nara, indicating that this temple had some connection with either the Korean Peninsula or the Asian continent. The artifacts are now stored in the Okazaki City Museum of Art.

The site is currently maintained as an archaeological park with the foundations of the buildings on display. It is a three-minute walk from the "Kitano" bus stop on the Meitetsu Bus from Higashi Okazaki Station on the Meitetsu Nagoya Main Line.

== See also ==
- List of Historic Sites of Japan (Aichi)
