= Arashi filmography =

This filmography presents a list of Japanese boy band Arashi's work outside of music such as hosting variety programs, appearing in films and television dramas and presenting radio shows.

== Drama ==
=== V no Arashi ===
V no Arashi (Vの嵐) was a Japanese mini-drama that aired on Fuji Television (Fuji TV) from October 11, 1999, to October 29, 1999, with each episode lasting for six minutes.

== Movie ==
=== Pikanchi Life Is Hard Dakedo Happy ===
Pikanchi Life Is Hard Dakedo Happy (ピカ☆ンチ Life is Hard だけど Happy, Pikanchi Life is Hard But Happy) is a 2002 Japanese movie based on an original idea by Yoshihiko Inohara and directed by Yukihiko Tsutsumi. The movie revolves around five friends who all have no future plans after high school. The five main characters are: Haru (Satoshi Ohno), Chu (Sho Sakurai), Shun (Masaki Aiba), Takuma (Kazunari Ninomiya), and Bon (Jun Matsumoto). Released on June 25, 2003, the DVD debuted at number four on the Oricon weekly comprehensive DVD chart.

=== Pikanchi Life Is Hard Dakara Happy ===
Pikanchi Life Is Hard Dakara Happy (ピカ☆☆ンチ Life is Hard だから Happy, Pikanchi Life is Hard Therefore Happy) is a 2004 Japanese movie directed by Yukihiko Tsutsumi. The movie picks up three years after Pikanchi Life Is Hard Dakedo Happy, in which the five friends, now all in their 20s, have a reunion. Released on October 20, 2004, the DVD debuted at number two on the Oricon weekly comprehensive DVD chart.

=== Kiiroi Namida ===
Kiiroi Namida (黄色い涙, Yellow Tears) is a 2007 Japanese movie directed by Isshin Inudō (犬童 一心, Inudō Isshin). The movie is based on a manga by Shinji Nagashima. In the bustle of 1960s Tokyo, five ambitious young men cross paths and develop a strong friendship.

=== Pikanchi Life Is Hard Tabun Happy ===
Pikanchi Life Is Hard Tabun Happy (ピカ☆★☆ンチ Life is Hard たぶん Happy, Pikanchi Life is Hard Maybe Happy) (read as Pikanchi Half) is a 2014 Japanese movie based on an original idea by Yoshihiko Inohara and directed by Hisashi Kimura. Pikanchi Half is a spin-off episode of the two previous movies in the series, showing the five friends, now in their 30s, having a reunion as they are running into problems with family and work.

== Variety ==
=== Nippon Television ===
==== Mayonaka no Arashi ====
Mayonaka no Arashi (真夜中の嵐, Midnight Arashi) was a Japanese variety show that ran from October 3, 2001, to June 26, 2002, on Nippon Television (NTV). Aired from 12:45 to 1:15 a.m. (JST), it was Arashi's first independent variety show, in which they were the primary hosts.

If there's a mountain, climb; if there's an ocean, dive; if there's a cliff, fly. (Note: The show's slogan. Original text: 山なら登れ、海なら潜れ、崖なら飛べ)

— Shinichi Hatori (co-host), Mayonaka no Arashi (Episode 1)

Described as an adventure show, at least one member would solitarily explore different parts of Japan by bicycle until sunrise without any money or a map. He would board the last train of the night and exit the train at any station he pleases. The starting point of the journey across Japan began at Makurazaki Station in the Kagoshima Prefecture (south of Japan) and ended at Cape Sōya in Hokkaidō (north of Japan), where Arashi and their co-host Shinichi Hatori (Zoom in! Super newscaster) buried a time capsule containing items the members received during their adventures and letters to their future selves. Hatori and Arashi opened the time capsule during the group's live tenth anniversary special Odoroki no Arashi! The Century's Biggest Experiments! Impossible Feats Special & Miracle Experiments Live Broadcast! on November 1, 2009.

Episode guide
| # | Air date | Adventurer | From | To | Locations of exploration |
|---|---|---|---|---|---|
| 1 | 2001-10-03 | Sho Sakurai | Makurazaki Station (Makurazaki, Kagoshima) | Nishi-Ōyama Station (Ibusuki, Kagoshima) | Sunamushi Onsen; Chrysanthemum Farm; Lake Ikeda |
| 2 | 2001-10-10 | Masaki Aiba | Satsuma-Imaizumi Station (Ibusuki, Kagoshima) | Kagoshima-Chūō Station (Kagoshima) | Io World Kagoshima Aquarium; Sakurajima Ferrybost; Sakurajima |
| 3 | 2001-10-17 | Jun Matsumoto | Kagoshima Station (Kagoshima) | Mochibaru Station (Mimata, Miyazaki) | Nakamura Ranch Milk Farm |
| 4 | 2001-10-24 | Satoshi Ohno | Miyazaki Station (Miyazaki) | Saiki Station (Saiki, Ōita) | Saiki Umaimon Avenue; Saiki Harbor; Shiroyama |
| 5 | 2001-10-31 | Kazunari Ninomiya | Usuki Station (Usuki, Ōita) | Mojikō Station (Kitakyūshū) | Kitakyūshū Harbor; Kanmon Tunnel |
| 6 | 2001-11-07 | Matsumoto | Shimonoseki Station (Shimonoseki, Yamaguchi) | Kawatana-Onsen Station (Shimonoseki, Yamaguchi) | Kurusonzan Mountain Shūzenji |
| 7 | 2001-11-14 | Sakurai | Nagatoshi Station (Nagato, Yamaguchi) | Masuda Station (Masuda, Shimane) | Masuda Tsuchida Town; Ōhama Fishing Harbor; Takashima Island |
| 8 | 2001-11-21 | Ohno | Sandankyō Station (Akiōta, Hiroshima) | Hiroshima Station (Hiroshima) | Nagarekawa |
| 9 | 2001-11-28 | Aiba | Kaitaichi Station (Kaita, Hiroshima) | Kōchi Station (Higashihiroshima, Hiroshima) | Matsutake Plantation |
| 10 | 2001-12-05 | Ninomiya | Mihara Station (Mihara, Hiroshima) | Osafune Station (Setouchi, Okayama) | Osafune, Okayama |
| 11 | 2001-12-12 | Best and Deleted Footage Special | | | |
| 12 | 2001-12-19 | Sakurai | Jōtō Station (Okayama) | Kyoto Station (Kyoto) | Arashiyama |
| 13 | 2001-12-26 | Ninomiya | Nagaokakyō Station (Nagaokakyō, Kyoto) | Ōsaka Station (Osaka) | Minami Senba; Dōtonbori; Sennichimae; Osaka Castle Park |
| 14 | 2002-01-09 | Matsumoto | Tennōji Station (Osaka) | Nara Station (Nara) | Nara Park |
| 15 | 2002-01-16 | Ohno | Kamo Station (Kizugawa, Kyoto) | Kōka Station (Kōka, Shiga) | Koka Ninja Village |
| 16 | 2002-01-23 | Aiba | Kusatsu Station (Kusatsu, Shiga) | Gifu Station (Gifu) | Kuzu-ken Shinto shrine; Nagara River |
| 17 | 2002-01-30 | Aiba | Chikusa Station (Nagoya) | Kami-Suwa Station (Suwa, Nagano) | |
| 18 | 2002-02-06 | Ninomiya, Sakurai | Okaya Station (Okaya, Nagano) | Inashi Station (Ina, Nagano) | |
| 19 | 2002-02-13 | Matsumoto | Shiojiri Station (Shiojiri, Nagano) | Togari-Nozawaonsen Station (Iiyama, Nagano) | Nozawaonsen, Nagano |
| 20 | 2002-02-20 | Matsumoto | Tokyo Compilation Special | | |
| 21 | 2002-02-27 | | Tokyo Compilation Special | | |
| 22 | 2002-03-06 | Aiba, Ninomiya, Sakurai | Tokyo Compilation Special | | |
| 23 | 2002-03-13 | Ninomiya, Ohno, Sakurai | Tokyo Compilation Special | | |
| 24 | 2002-03-20 | Ninomiya, Ohno, Sakurai | Tokyo Compilation Special | | |
| 25 | 2002-03-27 | Matsumoto | Tokyo Compilation Special | | |
| 26 | 2002-04-03 | Ohno | Tokyo Compilation Special | | |
| 27 | 2002-04-10 | Aiba | | Naganohara-Kusatsuguchi Station (Naganohara, Gunma) | Kusatsu Onsen; Shiriyaki Onsen |
| 28 | 2002-04-17 | Ninomiya | | Kuroiso Station (Nasushiobara, Tochigi) | Nasu Kogen |
| 29 | 2002-04-24 | Sakurai | Kurodahara Station (Nasu, Tochigi) | Shirakawa Station (Shirakawa, Fukushima) | Dekotora; Iimoriyama |
| 30 | 2002-05-01 | Ohno | | | Kaminoyama Race Course |
| 31 | 2002-05-08 | Sakurai | | Hadachi Station (Oga, Akita) | Oga, Akita (Namahage) |
| 32 | 2002-05-15 | Matsumoto | | Hon-Hachinohe Station (Hachinohe, Aomori) | Kabura island |
| 33 | 2002-05-22 | Ninomiya | Aomori Station (Aomori) | Hakodate Station (Hakodate, Hokkaidō) | Mount Hakodate; Goryōkaku; Hakodate Asaichi |
| 34 | 2002-05-29 | Ohno | | | Susukino |
| 35 | 2002-06-05 | Aiba | | | Furano, Hokkaidō |
| 36 | 2002-06-12 | Arashi | Tokyo Compilation Special | | |
| 37 | 2002-06-19 | Right-Before-the-Goal Special | | | |
| 38 | 2002-06-26 | Arashi, Shinichi Hatori | Wakkanai Station (Wakkanai, Hokkaidō) | Cape Sōya | |

==== C no Arashi ====
C no Arashi (Cの嵐!, Arashi's Claims) was a Japanese variety show that ran from July 3, 2002, to June 18, 2003, on NTV. Aired from 12:58 to 1:28 a.m. (JST), it was Arashi's second variety show to be aired on NTV. Forming Japan's first claim processing company and acting as "Claim Agents", at least one member would help process the complaints of government offices and enterprises every week.

Episode guide
| # | Air date | Claim Agents | Complaints |
|---|---|---|---|
| 1 | 2002-07-03 | Masaki Aiba, Sho Sakurai | Abandoned bicycles |
| 1 | 2002-07-03 | Jun Matsumoto, Kazunari Ninomiya, Satoshi Ohno | Abandoned bicycles |
| 2 | 2002-07-10 | Matsumoto, Ohno | Waste minimisation |
| 3 | 2002-07-17 | Ninomiya | Real property |
| 3 | 2002-07-17 | Aiba, Ohno, Sakurai | Real property |
| 4 | 2002-07-24 | Matsumoto, Sakurai | Wigs |
| 4 | 2002-07-24 | Aiba, Ninomiya, Ohno | Wigs |
| 5 | 2002-07-31 | Matsumoto, Sakurai | Store interior, television sets |
| 5 | 2002-07-31 | Aiba, Ohno | Store interior, television sets |
| 6 | 2002-08-07 | Aiba, Matsumoto, Ohno | Sumidagawa Fireworks Festival |
| 7 | 2002-08-14 | Special | |
| 8 | 2002-08-21 | Ninomiya, Sakurai | Assessment of used cars |
| 8 | 2002-08-21 | Aiba, Matsumoto, Ohno | Live performances, music classrooms |
| 9 | 2002-08-28 | Aiba | Black kites |
| 9 | 2002-08-28 | Matsumoto | Raccoons |
| 9 | 2002-08-28 | Ninomiya, Ohno, Sakurai | Coasts |
| 10 | 2002-09-04 | Ninomiya, Sakurai | Dogs |
| 10 | 2002-09-04 | Aiba, Matsumoto, Ohno | Store interior |
| 11 | 2002-09-11 | Matsumoto, Ohno | Mobile phones |
| 12 | 2002-09-18 | Ninomiya | Rental shop taxes in arrears |
| 13 | 2002-09-25 | Aiba, Ninomiya | Rental shop taxes in arrears |
| 14 | 2002-10-02 | Special | |
| 15 | 2002-10-09 | Ninomiya | Perms |
| 16 | 2002-10-16 | Aiba, Sakurai | Store interior |
| 17 | 2002-10-23 | Matsumoto, Ohno | Cameras |
| 17 | 2002-10-23 | Aiba, Sakurai | Plastic surgery |
| 18 | 2002-10-30 | Aiba, Sakurai | Plastic surgery |
| 19 | 2002-11-06 | Ninomiya, Ohno | Nursery schools |
| 20 | 2002-11-13 | Aiba, Sakurai | Keys |
| 20 | 2002-11-13 | Matsumoto | Keys |
| 21 | 2002-11-20 | Matsumoto, Ninomiya, Sakurai | Street lights, fly-tipping, road service |
| 22 | 2002-11-27 | Aiba, Ohno | Parks, waste sorting |
| 23 | 2002-12-04 | Ohno, Sakurai | Computer games, eternal patterns |
| 24 | 2002-12-11 | Aiba, Matsumoto | Omiai parties |
| 25 | 2002-12-18 | Ninomiya | Omiai parties |
| 26 | 2002-12-25 | Recap Special | |
| 27 | 2003-01-08 | Aiba, Ohno | Coming of Age Day |
| 28 | 2003-01-15 | Matsumoto, Ohno | Real property, deposits |
| 29 | 2003-01-22 | Matsumoto, Ninomiya, Sakurai | Plastic surgery |
| 30 | 2003-01-29 | Matsumoto, Ninomiya | Plastic surgery |
| 31 | 2003-02-05 | Ohno, Sakurai | VAIO |
| 32 | 2003-02-12 | Matsumoto, Ninomiya | Brand goods |
| 33 | 2003-02-19 | Aiba, Ninomiya | Structure relocation |
| 34 | 2003-02-26 | Aiba, Ohno | Sakurai on the set of drama Yoiko no Mikata |
| 35 | 2003-03-05 | Matsumoto, Ohno, Sakurai | Smoking prohibition on streets |
| 36 | 2003-03-12 | Ninomiya, Sakurai | Nail art |
| 37 | 2003-03-19 | Matsumoto, Ohno | Sale on wigs, stores |
| 38 | 2003-03-24 | Make no Arashi, D no Arashi | |
| 39 | 2003-04-02 | Ninomiya, Sakurai | Curry, part-time jobs |
| 40 | 2003-04-09 | Aiba, Matsumoto, Ninomiya | Japan's taxicabs |
| 41 | 2003-04-16 | Aiba, Ninomiya | Cleaning |
| 42 | 2003-04-23 | Matsumoto, Ohno | Tama-chan, closed railroad crossings |
| 43 | 2003-04-30 | Ohno, Sakurai | Crows |
| 44 | 2003-05-07 | Aiba, Ninomiya | Crows |
| 45 | 2003-05-14 | Aiba, Matsumoto, Ninomiya | Abandoned bicycles, bicycles, litter |
| 46 | 2003-05-21 | Aiba, Ninomiya | Police, sentō |
| 47 | 2003-05-28 | D no Arashi | |
| 48 | 2003-06-04 | Ninomiya, Ohno | Aqueducts, special use automobiles |
| 49 | 2003-06-11 | Aiba, Sakurai | Pet-sitters |
| 50 | 2003-06-18 | Recap Special | |
| 51 | 2003-06-25 | Recap Special | |

==== G no Arashi ====
G no Arashi (Gの嵐!) was a Japanese variety show that ran from October 5, 2005, to September 27, 2006, on NTV. Aired from 12:50 to 1:20 a.m. (JST), it was Arashi's fourth variety show to be aired on NTV. The show centered on Arashi acting as supporters for other people, which ranged from solving personal problems to helping promote the awareness of minor sports.

Episode guide
| # | Air date | Supporters | Supporting |
|---|---|---|---|
| 1 | 2005-10-05 | Satoshi Ohno, Kazunari Ninomiya | Tone-deaf people |
| 2 | 2005-10-12 | Sho Sakurai, Masaki Aiba | Boxer that has a consecutive losing streak |
| 3 | 2005-10-19 | Ninomiya, Jun Matsumoto | Love confession of an Akiba-kei-like man |
| 4 | 2005-10-26 | Ohno, Sakurai | Man who dreams of making a movie |
| 5 | 2005-11-02 | Aiba, Ninomiya | Man who claims to be able to contact UFOs |
| 6 | 2005-11-09 | Arashi | Minor sports: Kin-Ball vs. Kabaddi |
| 7 | 2005-11-16 | Aiba, Matsumoto | Chibi girls |
| 8 | 2005-11-23 | Aiba, Ninomiya | Man who claims to be able to contact UFOs: Part 2 |
| 9 | 2005-11-30 | Ohno, Matsumoto | Love confession of a cosplayer |
| 10 | 2005-12-07 | Arashi | Minor sports: Speedball, paintball |
| 11 | 2005-12-14 | A no Arashi special | |
| 12 | 2005-12-21 | Arashi | Air guitar |
| 13 | 2006-01-04 | Uda Uda special: Aiba Sugoroku; Unseen footage collection | |
| 14 | 2006-01-11 | Ohno, Matsumoto | Love confession of a biker |
| 15 | 2006-01-18 | Arashi | Air guitar: Part 2 |
| 16 | 2006-01-25 | Aiba, Matsumoto | Love confession of kindergartener |
| 17 | 2006-02-01 | Arashi | All-male cheerleading group |
| 18 | 2006-02-08 | Ohno, Ninomiya | Love confession of a Newhalf |
| 19 | 2006-02-15 | Arashi | Air guitar: Part 3 |
| 20 | 2006-02-22 | A no Arashi special | |
| 21 | 2006-03-01 | Unseen footage special: Concentration game: Ohno's drawings vs. Sakurai's drawings; A no Arashi; Air guitar | |
| 22 | 2006-03-08 | Arashi | Air guitar: Part 4 |
| 23 | 2006-03-15 | Ninomiya, Matsumoto | Girl who wants to fart in front of her boyfriend |
| 24 | 2006-03-22 | Sakurai, Aiba | Mirror hypnosis on a man with fear of germs |
| 25 | 2006-03-29 | Arashi | Minor sports grand prix: Sports shuriken; Sports Chanbara; Flingo; Unicurl; Artistic cycling; Netball; Casting; Go-Ball |
| 26 | 2006-04-05 | Arashi | Air guitar: Part 5 |
| 27 | 2006-04-12 | Arashi | Air guitar battle: Part 1 |
| 28 | 2006-04-19 | Arashi | Air guitar battle: Part 2 |
| 29 | 2006-04-26 | Ohno, Sakurai | Love confession of a newhalf |
| 30 | 2006-05-03 | Unseen footage special: Aiba Surogoku; A no Arashi; Air guitar | |
| 31 | 2006-05-10 | Sakurai, Aiba | Mirror hypnosis: Part 2 |
| 32 | 2006-05-17 | Sakurai, Aiba | Mirror hypnosis: Part 2 |
| 33 | 2006-05-24 | Sakurai, Ninomiya | No good host |
| 34 | 2006-05-31 | A no Arashi special | |
| 35 | 2006-06-07 | Ohno, Sakurai | Fierljeppen |
| 36 | 2006-06-14 | Ninomiya, Matsumoto | Girl who wants to fart in front of her boyfriend: Part 2 |
| 37 | 2006-06-21 | 200th episode special (since C no Arashi): Aiba Surogoku; Commemoration footage of C no Arashi, D no Arashi and G no Arashi | |
| 38 | 2006-06-28 | Ni no Arashi recap special | |
| 39 | 2006-07-05 | Aiba, Ohno, Sakurai | Newhalf boss |
| 40 | 2006-07-12 | Ninomiya, Matsumoto | Teaching swimming |
| 41 | 2006-07-19 | Haiku competition special | |
| 42 | 2006-07-26 | Ohno, Ninomiya | Otagei (an otaku dance) |
| 43 | 2006-08-02 | Arashi | Minor sports: Sports Nunchaku |
| 44 | 2006-08-09 | Matsumoto, Ohno, Sakurai | Minor sports: Canyoning |
| 45 | 2006-08-16 | A no Arashi special | |
| 46 | 2006-08-23 | Unseen footage special: Concentration game: Part 2; Unseen footage collection | |
| 47 | 2006-08-30 | Ninomiya, Ohno, Sakurai | Teaching Sakurai how to draw |
| 48 | 2006-09-06 | Haiku competition special: Part 2 | |
| 49 | 2006-09-13 | Aiba Surogoku special | |
| 50 | 2006-09-20 | Uda Uda special | |
| 51 | 2006-09-27 | Uda Uda special | |

==== Arashi no Shukudai-kun ====
Arashi no Shukudai-kun (嵐の宿題くん, Arashi's Homework) was a Japanese variety show that was first broadcast on October 2, 2006, on NTV. It aired from 11:58 p.m. to 12:29 a.m. (JST) every Monday and starred the members of Arashi and morning announcer Tomoaki Ogura (小倉 智昭, Ogura Tomoaki) as their co-host. The theme centered on homework, hence the show's title; Arashi had audience viewers send in homework for guests to do and vice versa. The show ended on March 22, 2010.

Episode guide
2006
| # | Air date | Guest | Guest's homework | Viewers' homework and others | Ratings |
|---|---|---|---|---|---|
| 1 | October 2 | Naoko Iijima | Chunky meat | Kiritanpo | |
| 2 | October 9 | Kano sisters | Yōkai | Limit of curry | |
| 3 | October 16 | Atsuko Takahata | Octopus tempura | Low-calorie foods | |
| 4 | October 23 | Otoha | Beauty salons | Jam | |
| 5 | October 30 | Akiko Wada | Fugu dishes | | |
| 6 | November 6 | Sarina Suzuki | Massager | Binoculars taped to glasses experiment | |
| 7 | November 13 | Kazuyo Matsui | Vegetables | Silk vs cotton | |
| 8 | November 20 | Shigeru Muroi | Underground rooms | Rate of which paper absorbs different liquids experiment | |
| 9 | November 27 | Megumi Yasu | Natto | Newton's cradle | |
| 10 | December 4 | Kaoru Sugita | Collagen | Which is faster on ice? Running vs biking | |
| 11 | December 11 | Marina Watanabe | Tea | Using ice skates to cut things while ice skating | |
| 12 | December 18 | Rie Shibata | Nabe | Luxury goods at 100 yen | |
| 13 | December 25 | Christmas special! | | | |
2007
| 14 | January 8 | Senryū Ōgiri Tournament | | Mochi | |
| 15 | January 15 | Kaori Manabe | Kimchi | Recorder | |
| 16 | January 22 | Mayuko Takata | Sushi | Speed gun | |
| 17 | January 29 | Marie | Avocado | Dry ice | |
| 18 | February 5 | Yoshihiko Inohara, Shunsuke Kiyokiba | Omurice | Mix food | |
| 19 | February 12 | Harisenbon | Pasta | Vacuum experiment | |
| 20 | February 20 | Yuko Ogura | Eating food with other food | Filtration experiment | |
| 21 | February 27 | The Touch | Hamburgers | Food that becomes delicious when you add salt to it | |
| 22 | March 5 | Waka Inoue | Pork | 20 °C → 50 °C hot liquid | |
| 23 | March 12 | Kyoko Fukada | Gyoza | Tempura | |
| 24 | March 19 | "Odoroki no Arashi! 2" Highlights "Odoroki no Arashi! 1" Reflections | | | |
| 25 | March 26 | "Odoroki no Arashi! 2" Unaired scenes | | | |
| 26 | April 2 | Morisanchū | Ramen | Guest's best skits | |
| 27 | April 9 | Yoiko | Curry | Oshiete Arashi | |
| 28 | April 16 | Akiko Hinagata | Sweets | Oshiete Arashi | |
| 29 | April 23 | Nankai Candies | Donburi | Headphones and Eye masks | |
| 30 | April 30 | Karina | Nagoya cuisine | Oshiete Arashi | |
| 31 | May 7 | Megumi | Pickled things | Vacuum experiment | |
| 32 | May 14 | Drunk Dragon | Shrimp dishes | Methods of repelling molesters | |
| 33 | May 21 | Taichi Kokubun | Salads of the World | Johnny's mini athletics meet | |
| 34 | May 28 | Anne Suzuki | Ethnic foods | Anne - 1 Grand Prix | |
| 35 | June 4 | Nana Katase | Yam dishes | One's own way of thinking | |
| 36 | June 11 | Ungirls | Tsukemen | Capital quiz | |
| 37 | June 18 | ManaKana | Okinawan cuisine | Ristorante fake | |
| 38 | June 25 | Penalty | Stamina food | Silly athletics meet | |
| 39 | July 2 | Rei Kikukawa, Ai Takabe | Beauty foods | One's own way of thinking | |
| 40 | July 9 | Tutorial | Chocolate gourmet | Headphones and Eye masks | |
| 41 | July 16 | Aya Ueto | Egg dishes | Backwards acting | |
| 42 | July 23 | Takeshi Nadagi, Tomochika | Soup | LoveLove check | |
| 43 | July 30 | Nana Eikura | Korean cuisine | Ristorante fake | |
| 44 | August 6 | Tomonori Jinnai | Fruit | Love consultation mail | |
| 45 | August 13 | Kyaeen | Delicious lukewarm food | Sketch tournament Aiba and Udo swap places | |
| 46 | August 20 | Every Little Thing | Hokkaido cuisine | Silly athletics meet | |
| 47 | August 27 | Machamacha, Hikaru Daita | Sweets | 6-members perform "Arashi" | |
| 48 | September 3 | Natsu Yasumi no Shukudai Yari Nokoshi Special | | Oshiete Arashi; Headphones and Eye masks | |
| 49 | September 10 | Sumiko Nishioka, Ryo Fukawa | Bitter food | Showing old footage of the guests | |
| 50 | September 17 | Yu Yamada | Food made with dairy products | Yoga and Jump rope | |
| 51 | September 24 | Cunning Takayama | Hamburgers | Minor sports | |
| 52 | October 1 | Shoko Nakagawa | Mushroom dishes | Cosplay tournament | |
| 53 | October 8 | "Odoroki no Arashi! 3" Highlights "Odoroki no Arashi! 2" Reflections | | | |
| 54 | October 15 | "Odoroki no Arashi! 3" Unaired scenes | | | |
| 55 | October 22 | Tomoko Tabata | Okonomiyaki | Silly athletics meet | |
| 56 | October 29 | Maki Tamaru | Autumn foods | Latest exercise | |
| 57 | November 5 | Mao Kobayashi | Yakitori | Minor sports | |
| 58 | November 12 | Kenji Tamura | Yakiniku store menu | Hara Moji challenge | |
| 59 | November 19 | Impulse | Delicious high-calorie food | Game simulation | |
| 60 | November 26 | Yuko Fueki | Korean street food | Mousetrap game | |
| 61 | December 3 | Eiichirō Funakoshi | Homemade curry | Kazuyo Matsui quiz | |
| 62 | December 10 | Arashi's Housework King Finals! | | | |
| 63 | December 17 | Kirin | Bread | Game simulation | |
| 64 | December 24 | Yūka | Christmas cake | Livening up game | |
2008
| 65 | January 7 | New Year's card from the viewers Unaired scenes video release | | | |
| 66 | January 14 | Unjash | Tempura; Ways to waste time | Love psychology trick | |
| 67 | January 21 | Aiko Satō | Bird dishes from around the world | Recommended games | |
| 68 | January 28 | Momoko Kikuchi | Vegetables of the World | Housework obstacle course | |
| 69 | February 4 | Shinagawa Shōji | Nabe | Trivia quiz Muscle verification | |
| 70 | February 11 | Yui Ichikawa | Banana dishes | Shiodome Aiba Land: Dilatancy | |
| 71 | February 18 | Asakusa Kid | Smelly food | Sumo competition | |
| 72 | February 25 | Sandwich Man | Food stars love | Homework from the agency president | |
| 73 | March 3 | Mai Satoda | Deserts made from vegetables | Shiodome Aiba Land: Tag; Obstacle course | |
| 74 | March 10 | Izumi Mori | Fisherman dishes | Shiodome Aiba Land: Dilatancy | |
| 75 | March 17 | Chihara Brothers | Flour dishes from around the world | Shiodome Aiba Land: Ear to wall game; Combat game | |
| 76 | March 24 | Jun Natsukawa | Shrimp dishes | Shiodome Aiba Land: Dilatancy | |
| 77 | March 31 | Special Midokoro o Shōkai!! | | | |
| 78 | April 7 | Special Hōsō Chokugo Tokubetsu-hen!! | | | |
| 79 | April 14 | Aya Ueto | Bagels | Shiodome Aiba Land: Six Codes; Objection game | |
| 80 | April 21 | Hokuyō | Yakisoba | Shiodome Aiba Land: Competition | |
| 81 | April 28 | Bananaman | Ikemeshi | Shiodome Aiba Land: Gesture game | |
| 82 | May 5 | Ayako Nishikawa | Limited menu | Drawing competition Motor nerve check | |
| 83 | May 12 | Shihori Kanjiya | Gyoza | Arm contest | |
| 84 | May 19 | Miyagawa Daisuke | Fried rice | Shiodome Aiba Land: Daruma-san ga Honyarara | |
| 85 | May 26 | Aki Hoshino | Bread | Laughter yoga Belo out gymnastics | |
| 86 | June 2 | Takanori Nishikawa | Ramen | Shiodome Aiba Land: Sky gesture game | |
| 87 | June 9 | Fujisaki Market | Unagi | Impersonations; Bad episodes | |
| 88 | June 16 | Harumi Edo | Exciting deserts | Tetsurō Degawa acting theory | |
| 89 | June 23 | Dachou Club | Jimon's recommended menu | Dice talk | |
| 90 | June 30 | Unaired Shiodome Aiba Land scenes New Game special | | | |
| 91 | July 7 | Ogi Yahagi | Pizza | Yahagi's special skills | |
| 92 | July 14 | Mikako Tabe | Summer vegetable dishes | Challenging Yoshimoto Kogyo | |
| 93 | July 21 | Ai Haruna | Curry | Ai Haruna's sex reassignment surgery | |
| 94 | July 28 | Maki Sakai | Surplus cuisine | Shiodome Aiba Land: Hana Ichi Monme game | |
| 95 | August 4 | Live-ish special | | Mail received from the viewers special | |
| 96 | August 11 | Fujiwara | Stamina food | Takayuki Haranishi gag challenge | |
| 97 | August 18 | Satomi Ishihara | Fruit | Midsummer silly athletics meet | |
| 98 | August 25 | Yukina Kinoshita | Habanero dishes | Shiodome Aiba Land: Drink, drink, answer, drink game | |
| 99 | September 1 | 24-hour TV Special | | | |
| 100 | September 8 | Shikao Suga | Mushroom dishes | Fireworks; Shiodome Aiba Land: Improvisation artist game | |
| 101 | September 15 | Hige Danshaku | The world's three delicacies | Shiodome Aiba Land: Impersonations | |
| 102 | September 22 | TKO | Pork dishes | TKO's special skills | |
| 103 | September 29 | Sayaka Kanda | Cheese dishes | Shiodome Aiba Land: Improvisation artist game | |
| 104 | October 6 | Akina Minami | Parfait | Trying to find Akina's special skill | |
| 105 | October 13 | Sekai no Nabeatsu | Nabe | Neta Ranking Best 7 | |
| 106 | October 20 | Hitomi Yoshizawa | Egg dishes | Shiodome Aiba Land: Improvisation artist game 2 | |
| 107 | October 27 | Takahiro Yamamoto | Shrimp dishes | Qingdao troupe | |
| 108 | November 3 | Arata Furuta | Lotus root dishes | Shiodome Aiba Land: Heaven and hell game | |
| 109 | November 10 | Tutorial | Oyster dishes | Fukuda formula | |
| 110 | November 17 | No Money Special | | | |
| 111 | November 24 | Suzanne | Potato dishes | News Shukudai | |
| 112 | December 1 | Daigo | Fondue | Shiodome Aiba Land | |
| 113 | December 8 | Yuna Ito | Fruit | Shiodome Aiba Land: Slipper free throw | |
| 114 | December 15 | Masami Hisamoto | Christmas cake | Love power check | |
| 115 | December 22 | "Odoroki no Arashi! 5" Highlights "A no Arashi" Playback | | | |

==== Arashi ni Shiyagare ====
Arashi ni Shiyagare (嵐にしやがれ) (Must Be ARASHI!) is an ongoing Japanese variety show on NTV starring the members of Arashi. The show began on 24 April 2010 and it airs from 10:00 to 10:54 p.m. (JST) every Saturday. It is Arashi's sixth and current variety show to be aired on NTV as well as their third show to be aired during primetime. There will be a male guest, which the members of Arashi addresses as 'Aniki' (Brother), who will teach Arashi different things. The other section, called 'Encounter the Unknown', is where Arashi will pick up new skills, such as interviewing celebrities, learning the tips to climb a mountain, from meeting experienced professionals they usually have not met before. On September 11, 2020 it was revealed that AniShi would stop airing by the end of the year.

=== Fuji Television ===
==== Nama Arashi: Live Storm ====
Nama Arashi: Live Storm (なまあらし LIVESTORM, Live Arashi: Live Storm) was a Japanese variety show that ran from October 5, 2002, to March 27, 2004, on Fuji Television (Fuji TV). It aired from 12:00 to 1:00 p.m. (JST) and was the group's first variety show on Fuji TV.

==== Arashi no Waza-Ari ====
Arashi no Waza-Ari (嵐の技ありッ!) was a Japanese variety show that ran from April 3, 2004, to March 26, 2005, on Fuji TV. It aired from 12:00 to 12:55 p.m. (JST), and the theme of the show centered on Arashi learning how to be adults by consulting a special guest.

==== GRA ====
GRA (Gold Rush Arashi) was a short-lived Japanese variety show that ran from October 20, 2007, to March 29, 2008, from 1:00 to 1:30 p.m. (JST) on Fuji TV.

==== VS Arashi ====
VS Arashi (VS嵐, Buiesu Arashi) is a Japanese variety show that was broadcast on Fuji TV. The show began on April 12, 2008, and, until September 19, 2009, aired on Saturday afternoons from 12:59 to 1:30 p.m. (JST). On October 22, 2009, the show moved to a Thursday time slot and aired from 7:00 to 7:57 p.m. (JST), making it Arashi's first show to air during Golden Time. The different games that the variety show includes are: Bound Hockey, Bank Bowling, Cliff Climb, Dual Curling, Falling Pipe, Giant Crash, GoGo Sweeper, Jumping Shooter, Jungle Bingo, Kicking Sniper, Korokoro Viking, Pinball Runner, Popcorn Hitter, Shotgun Disc, Rolling Coin Tower, Downhill Shooter, Bomber Striker. The last episode of VS Arashi aired in December 2020.

=== Tokyo Broadcasting System ===
==== Himitsu no Arashi-chan ====
Himitsu no Arashi-chan (ひみつの嵐ちゃん!, Arashi's Secrets; English transcription: The Arashi Secret TV Show) was a Japanese variety show on Tokyo Broadcasting System (TBS) starring Arashi and the members of Othello as their co-hosts. The show ran from April 10, 2008, to March 21, 2013, and aired from 10:00 to 10:54 p.m. (JST) every Thursday, making it the group's first show to air during primetime. There are different segments in the variety show: Arashi Sharehouse, V.I.P Room, V.I.P Limousine, Mote Mote Arashi! Dame Dame Arashi!, Mannequin 5, Host Royale, Ranking Derby, Doubt Actor.

== Non signature programs as regulars ==
- Gakibara teikoku 2000! (TBS, April 15, 2000 - March 10, 2001), corner "Ojuken Sentai Arashi" (お受験戦隊嵐)
- USO!? Japan (TBS, April 2001 – September 2003)

== Television specials ==
List of specials broadcast on Nippon Television
| Air date | Title |
|---|---|
| November 26, 2000 | Nishikiori & Arashi! Hajimete no N.Y. Gōka Yume no Hi Tour (New York) |
| April 3, 2004 | Asa na no ni D no Arashi |
| March 30, 2005 | Australia Tairiku Jūdan! Gekitō 3000 Kilo Ultra Strong Game (Australia) |
| September 26, 2006 | Odoroki no Arashi! Seiki no Jikken Gakusha Mo Yosoku Fukanō SP |
| March 23, 2007 | Odoroki no Arashi! Seiki no Jikken Gakusha Mo Yosoku Fukanō SP2 |
| October 11, 2007 | Odoroki no Arashi! Seiki no Jikken Gakusha Mo Yosoku Fukanō SP3 |
| April 6, 2008 | Odoroki no Arashi! Seiki no Jikken Gakusha Mo Yosoku Fukanō SP4 |
| December 28, 2008 | Odoroki no Arashi! Seiki no Jikken Gakusha Mo Yosoku Fukanō SP5 |
| March 24, 2009 | Arashi no Jikken & Shukudai-kun |
| October 25, 2009 – November 1, 2009 | Arashi Challenge Week (Note: The three-hour special that aired on November 1 registered an average viewership rating of 23.5%, with a momentary peak rating of 29.8%.) |
| January 1, 2011 | Arashi ni Shiyagare Ganjitsu 2-Jikanhan Special |

List of specials broadcast on Fuji Television
| Air date | Title |
|---|---|
| January 4, 2002 | Arashi no Narikiri Baraetei: Inu no Kimochi ni Natte Mimashita Wan! |
| July 21, 2002 | Arashi no Inu no Kimochi ni Natte Mimashita Wan Wan |
| March 31, 2007 | Asu he no Tobira |
| January 9, 2010 | Saigo no Yakusoku |
| January 3, 2012, January 3, 2013, January 3, 2014 | Kotatsu de Arashi |
| July 13, 2013, July 20, 2013 | Atarashi Arashi |
| January 3, 2015 | 2015-nen Sakidori Hakurankai Arashi Yohō |
| January 3, 2016 | Korekatsu Arashi |

List of specials broadcast on Tokyo Broadcasting System
| Air date | Title |
|---|---|
| December 25, 2007 | 2007 Shijō Saidai Sports Dai Kansha Festival |
| June 27, 2008 | Hana Yori Dango Special |

== Radio shows ==
List of radio shows
| Broadcast date | Station | Title |
|---|---|---|
| November 5, 1999 – November 26, 1999 | JOLF | Arashi no Kinyōbi |
| April 3, 2000 – September 30, 2002 | FM Tokyo | Arashi On |
| August 10, 2001 | JOLF | Arashi no @llnightnippon.com |
| July 6, 2003, July 13, 2003, July 20, 2003 | JFN | Sunday Special Arashi How's It Going? |
| July 28, 2003 – August 1, 2003 | JOLF | Shitteru? 24-Ji |
| April 25, 2007 | JOLF | Arashi no All Night Nippon |
| April 18, 2011 – March 19, 2012 | Date FM Miyagi | Arashi Shinsai Fukkō Shien Tokubetsu Bangumi |

== Event hosting ==
List of events
| Date | Title |
|---|---|
| December 31, 2007 – January 1, 2008 | Johnny's Countdown Live |
| December 31, 2008 – January 1, 2009 | Johnny's Countdown Live |
| December 31, 2009 – January 1, 2010 | Johnny's Countdown Live |
| December 31, 2010 | 61st NHK Kōhaku Uta Gassen |
| December 31, 2011 | 62nd NHK Kōhaku Uta Gassen |
| December 31, 2012 | 63rd NHK Kōhaku Uta Gassen |
| December 31, 2013 | 64th NHK Kōhaku Uta Gassen |
| December 31, 2014 | 65th NHK Kōhaku Uta Gassen |
| December 31, 2015 – January 1, 2016 | Johnny's Countdown Live |

== Commercials ==
In addition to starring in various TV shows, specials, and movies, Arashi appears in various commercials to endorse products for various companies ranging from fast food to video games. Here is a list of them.

=== List of commercials ===
- au by KDDI (2008–2012)
- Bourbon Japan (2000–2002)
- Coca-Cola (2003)
- GREE (2012)
  - Wacky Motors (Ninomiya, Ohno)
- GungHo Online Entertainment (2014–2020)
- Hitachi (2010–2020)
- House Foods (2003–2008, 2010–2011)
  - Osacks (2003–2005)
  - Vitamin Water, Vitamin Jelly, Lemon Water (2006–2007)
  - Tongari Corn (2007–2008, 2010–2011)
- Japan Airlines (2010–2020)
- Japan Post Holdings (2015–2020)
- Japan Tourism Agency (2010–2020)
- Kirin Company (2010–2020)
  - Tanrei Green Label (2010–2013)
  - Kirin Ichiban Shibori (2014–2020)
- McDonald's (2001)
- Mitsuya Cider (2010–2020)
- Morinaga Eskimo Pino (2002–2003)
- Nintendo (Note: Members appeared both individually and as a group.) (2010–2012)
  - Mario series
    - Mario Kart Wii (Matsumoto, Ninomiya)
    - New Super Mario Bros. Wii (Ninomiya, Ohno)
    - Super Mario Galaxy 2 (Aiba, Ninomiya)
    - Super Mario 3D Land (Ninomiya)
    - Mario Kart 7 (All members)
  - Wii Party (All members except Sakurai)
  - Wii Sports Resort (Aiba, Ohno)
  - Donkey Kong Country Returns (Matsumoto, Sakurai)
  - Nintendo 3DS (All members)
  - The Legend of Zelda: Ocarina of Time 3D (Matsumoto, Ninomiya)
- Nissan (2012–2015)
  - Pure Drive Series
  - Notteko Nissan Campaign
  - Nissan Wakuteku Campaign
  - Nissan Serena S-Hybrid (Aiba, Ohno)
  - Nissan Note (Ninomiya, Sakurai)
  - Nissan Note Medalist (Matsumoto)
  - Nissan Cube (Matsumoto, Ohno, Sakurai)
  - Nissan Leaf (Sakurai)
  - Nissan Dayz (Matsumoto, Ohno)
  - Nissan Dayz Roox (Aiba)
- NTT DoCoMo dHits (2016)
- Parco Grand Bazaar (2004)
- Stand up Hawaii!! Campaign (2002)

== Other ==
While in hiatus, Arashi continues giving fans something to keep them in mind, such as the release of the film "ARASHI Anniversary Tour 5×20: Record of Memories", a look at one of the 5x20 concerts, held on December 23, 2019, at Tokyo Dome. With the number "5" holding a special meaning since day one, referring to the unchanging number of members, and the only changing number being the one after, as in 5x20, the release of the information on May 22, 2021 gives a subtle hint to the continuation of the group (5x22), since in 2021 Arashi would celebrate 22 years of career. "ARASHI Anniversary Tour 5×20: Record of Memories" was screened first at the 24th Shanghai International Film Festival (June 11-20, 2021), and later in Japan on November 3, 2019, as pre-release, with its official release on November 26, both in normal and Dolby Cinema formats. The film was screened in other Asian countries, like Korea, Singapore, Malaysia, Hong Kong, indonesia and Taiwan. It was also screened in the US, including Hawaii, where the group started. On September 15, 2022, the film was released in a 4K/regular Blu-ray disc format set, and as a sole Blu-ray disc. The film reached the top spot in the movie genre category of the "Oricon Weekly BD Ranking". It was the first time in Oricon's history that a work achieved the highest first week sales exceeding 300,000 units sold, by selling 363,000 units.
