= Sabukaze Kiln Sites =

Remains of pottery kilns in Setouchi, Okayama, Japan

Sabukaze kiln ruins
- 寒風古窯跡群 (Japanese)
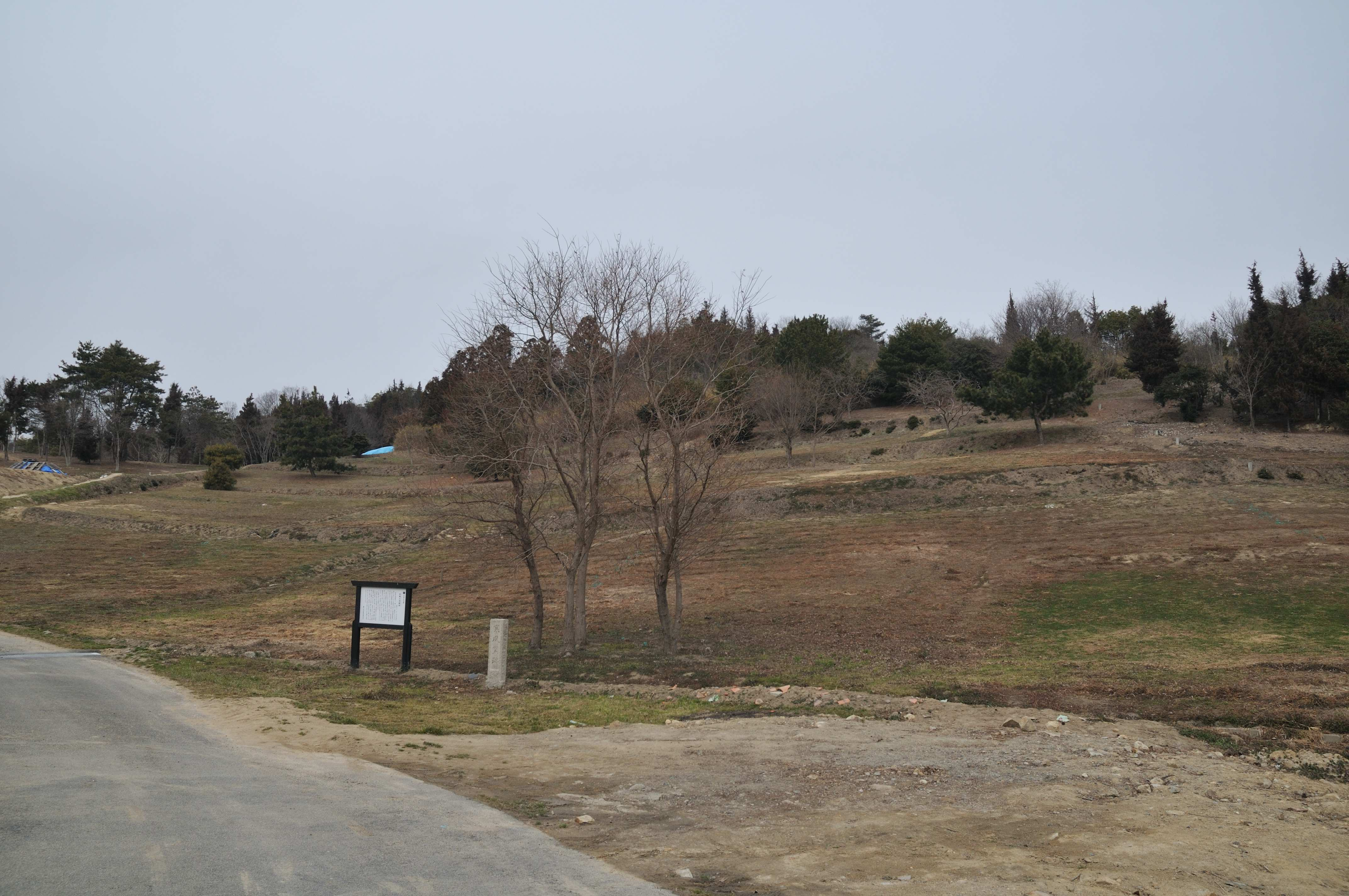
- Sabukaze kiln ruins

- Sabukaze kiln ruins Sabukaze Kiln Sites (Japan)
- Interactive map of Sabukaze kiln ruins
- 34°39′16.4″N 134°8′14.0″E
- Periods: Asuka - Heian period
- Location: Setouchi, Okayama, Japan
- Region: San'yō region

Site notes
- Public access: Yes (park)

Sabukaze kiln ruins (寒風古窯跡群, Sabukaze koyōseki-gun) is an archaeological site consisting of the remains of kilns for firing Sue ware pottery from the start of the Asuka period to the Heian period located in the Ushimado neighborhood of the city of Setouchi, Okayama Prefecture in the San'yō region of Japan. The site was the largest production area of Sue ware in western Japan, and the Sue ware from these kilns evolved into the current Bizen ware. The site has been protected by the central government as a National Historic Site since 1986.

== Overview ==
Sue ware is pottery brought to Japan from the Korean Peninsula in the middle of the Kofun period (approximately 1600 years ago). New techniques are used that were not used in Yayoi pottery and Haji ware, which were continuations from Jomon pottery, including the use of the potter's wheel and semi-underground anagama-style kilns. By using firing temperatures in excess of 1000 deg C, reduction flame firing became possible, resulting in a hard blue-grey pottery that had less porosity than previous techniques.

At the beginning of the twentieth century a local historian, Tokizane Mokusui, collected a large amount of Sue ware shards from the vicinity of the ruins and published a research journal, which led to recognition of the existence of the ruins in academia. From 1978, archaeological excavations were carried out, and continued from 2005 to 2008 to preserve and open the ruins to the public. The ruins consist of three kiln sites: Kiln No. 1, Kiln No. 2, and Kiln No. 3, however, multiple noborigama-style kilns with lengths of over ten meters have been found at each location. Three kiln sites have been confirmed at the No. 1 kiln, and currently, a total of five kiln sites have been confirmed at the No. 3 kiln. The kilns are located on the southwestern slope of a hill with an elevation of 50 to 60 meters, and the site also contains the ruins of a building thought to be the remains of a workshop and a pond. There is also a kofun burial mount located on the south slope of the hill, but this is not thought to be related to the kilns.

Along with the ashes of firewood, unsuccessfully fired pottery and other items have been unearthed. There items indicate that in addition to jars, plates, and bottles, the kilns also produced items such as ceramic coffins, Shibi roof ornaments and inkstones. As Sue ware items from these kilns have also unearthed from the capitals of Heijō-kyō and Fujiwara-kyō in Nara Prefecture, this suggests that the kiln was not simply a local kiln, but had an official function as well. The kiln was most active for a one-hundred year period from the beginning of the 7th century to the beginning of the 8th century.

The unearthed Sue pottery and other artifacts are stored and exhibited at the Sabukaze Tōgei Kaikan (寒風陶芸会館) on site

== See also ==
- List of Historic Sites of Japan (Okayama)
- Oibora-Asakura Sue Ware Kiln Site
- Dodo Sue Ware Kiln ruins
