= Kadota Shell Mound =

Ancient shell midden in Setouchi, Japan

- 門田貝塚 (Japanese)
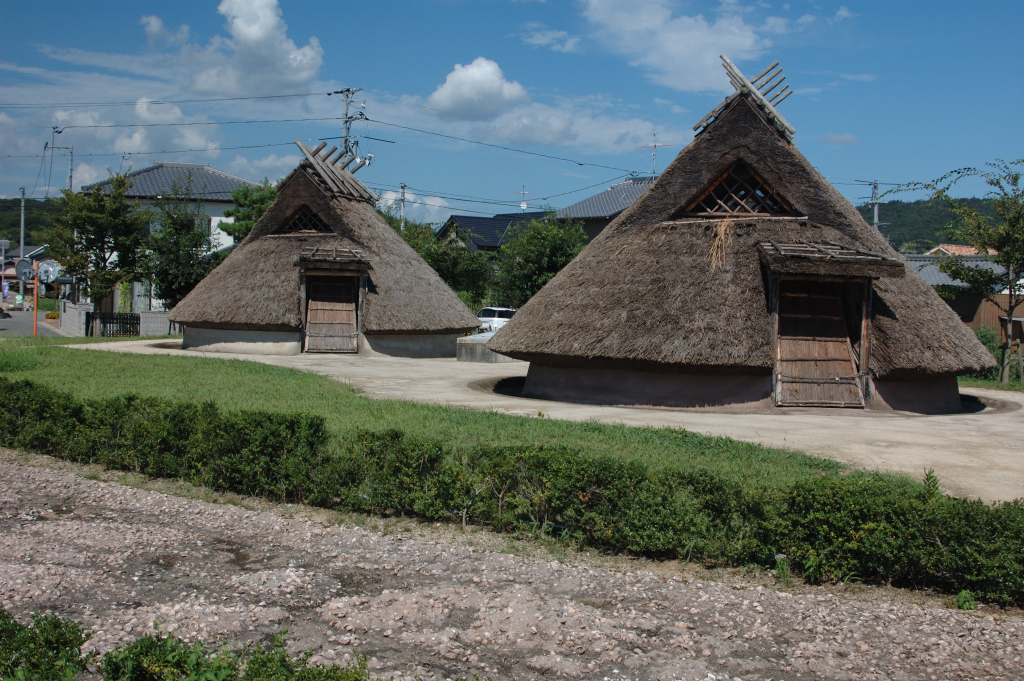
- Kadota Shell Mound Park

- Kadota Shell Mound Kadota Shell Mound (Japan)
- Interactive map of Kadota Shell Mound
- 34°40′0.4″N 134°5′40.7″E
- Type: shell midden, settlement
- Periods: Yayoi period
- Location: Setouchi, Okayama, Japan
- Region: San'yō region

Site notes
- Public access: Yes (park)

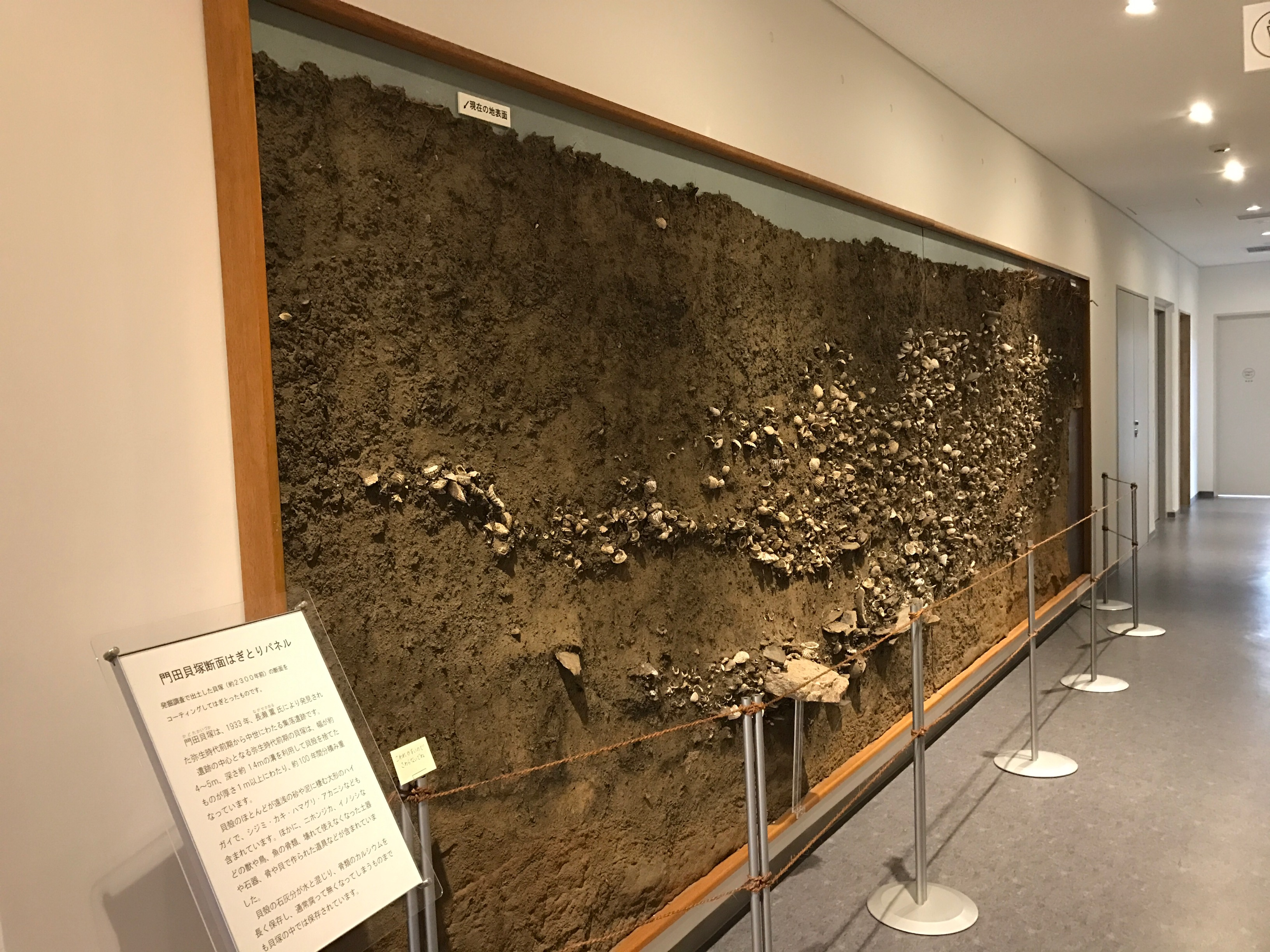
A cross section of the shell mound is on display at Setouchi Civic Library Momiwa Square

The Kadota Shell Mound (門田貝塚, Kadota kaizuka) is an archaeological site in the Oku neighborhood of the city of Setouchi, Okayama Prefecture, in the San'yō region of western Japan. It contains a shell midden and the traces of a prehistoric settlement, and was designated a National Historic Site of Japan in 1985.

== Overview ==
During the early to middle Jōmon period (approximately 4000 to 2500 BC), sea levels were five to six meters higher than at present, and the ambient temperature was also 2 deg C higher. During this period, the Kantō region was inhabited by the Jōmon people, many of whom lived in coastal settlements. The middens associated with such settlements contain bone, botanical material, mollusc shells, sherds, lithics, and other artifacts and ecofacts associated with the now-vanished inhabitants, and these features, provide a useful source into the diets and habits of Jōmon society. Some of these middens continued toy be used in then subsequent Yayoi period (300 BCE to 300 CE) and even later. Most of the 2400 known shell middens are found along the Pacific coast of Japan.

The Kadota Shell Mound is located on a natural embankment of the east bank of the Yoshii River near the coast of the Seto Inland Sea. Discovered by a local historian in 1934, it was excavated in 1950, and again in 1962, 1966 and 1982. It is estimated to extend over 200 meters from east-to-west and over 100 meters from north-to-south at an elevation of 2.4 meters above the present sea-level. The midden consists of the shells of clams and oysters, as well as animal bones from wild boars, deer, and raccoon dogs, birds, and fish. In addition, Yayoi pottery and stone tools such as stone axes and arrowheads were also discovered. Traces of unhulled rice have also been confirmed inside one of the jars. The excavated Yayoi pottery has distinctive markings, making this location type site for "Kadota type pottery", as an index for dating in the Seto Inland Sea coastal region. In addition, earthenware for making salt and mortars were excavated, confirming that salt was being made in the early Yayoi period.

In the vicinity of the shell mound, the remains of a pit dwelling and part of a building with pillars built into the ground, have been discovered, suggesting that there were settlement ruins dating from the early Yayoi period nearby. This settlement appears to have continuously occupied into the Kamakura period.

Today, the site has been developed as Kadota Kaizuka Historical Park, with reconstructions of pit dwellings. It is located about five minutes on foot from Oku Station on the JR West Akō Line. A cross section of the shell mound is on display at Setouchi Civic Library Momiwa Square. Artifacts excavated from the site were previously stored and displaced at the Setouchi Municipal Oku Local Museum, which is now closed.

== See also ==
- List of Historic Sites of Japan (Okayama)
