= Osafune =

Osafune may refer to:

- Osafune Station, a railway station in Setouchi, Okayama Prefecture, Japan
- Osafune, Okayama, a former town in Okayama Prefecture, Japan

== People with the surname ==
- Kana Osafune (長船 加奈, born 1989), Japanese footballer
