= Kabuyama Kofun =

Kofun period burial mound in Setouchi, Okayama, Japan

- 鹿歩山古墳 (Japanese)
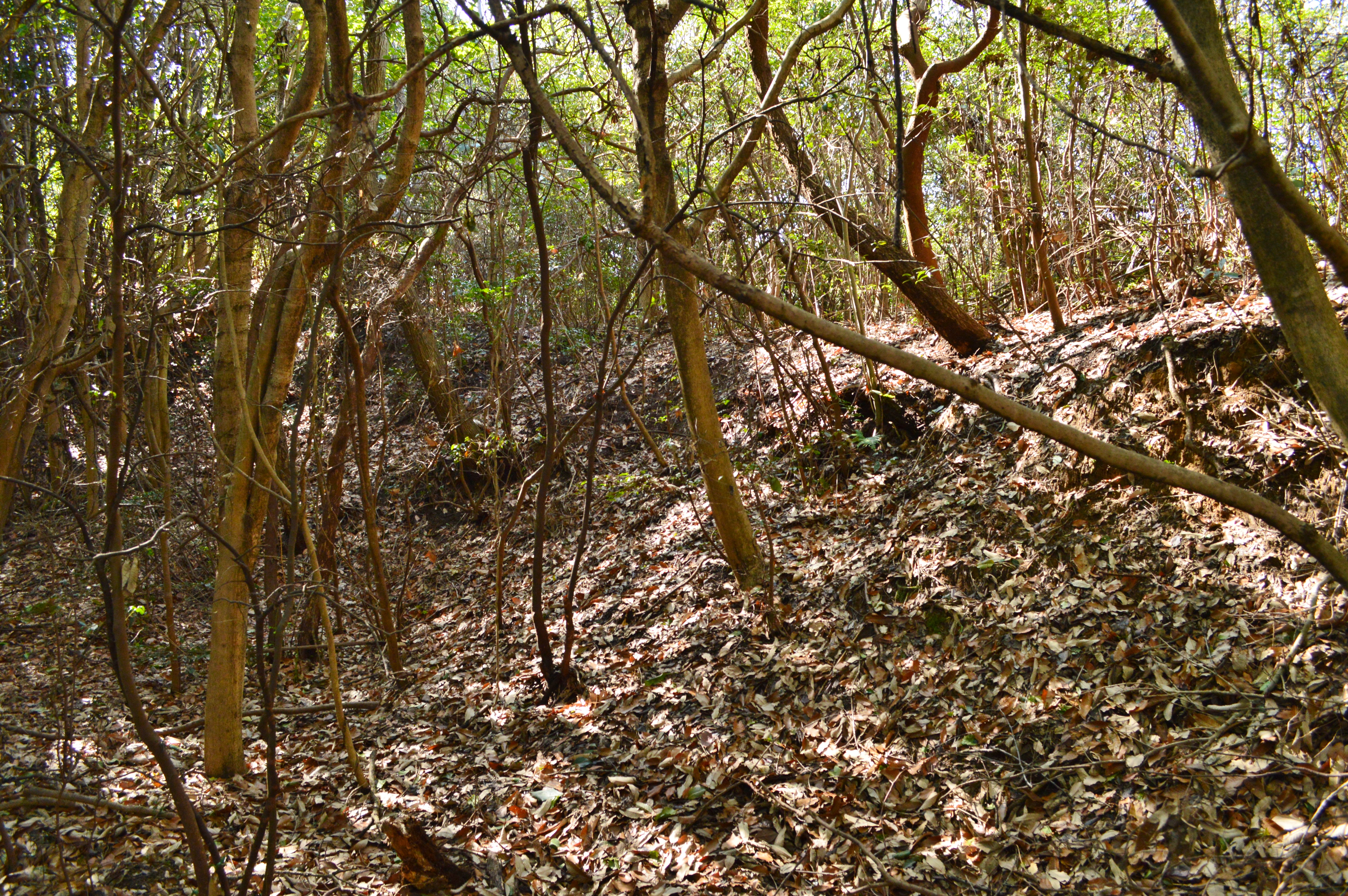
- Kabuyama Kofun

- Kabuyama Kofun Kabuyama Kofun (Japan)
- Interactive map of Kabuyama Kofun
- 34°36′54.75″N 134°8′38.75″E
- Type: Kofun
- Periods: Kofun period
- Location: Kashino, Ushimado-cho, Setouchi, Okayama, Japan
- Region: Chugoku region

History
- Built: late 5th century

Site notes
- Public access: yes
- Okayama Prefecture Historic Site

Ushimado Bay

The Kabuyama Kofun (鹿歩山古墳), also known as the Kabusan Kofun is a Kofun period burial mound, located in the Kashino, Ushimado-cho neighborhood of the city of Setouchi, Okayama Prefecture in the Chugoku region of western Japan. The tumulus was designated a Okayama Prefecture Historic Site in 1956.

== Overview ==
The Kabuyama Kofun is located on the summit of Mount Kabuyama (elevation 92.6 meters) in the central western part of Ushimado Bay in southeastern Okayama Prefecture. At the time of its construction, this was a peninsula jutting out into the Seto Inland Sea. In addition to this tumulus, five other keyhole-shaped burial mounds—Futatsukayama Kofun, Namiyama Kofun (now extinct), Ushimado Tenjinyama Kofun, and Kuroshima No. 1 Kofun—are known to have been constructed surrounding Ushimado Bay. Currently, a Shinto shrine, the Kashino Jinja is located south of the burial mound. No archaeological excavations have been conducted.

The tumulus is a zenpō-kōen-fun (前方後円墳), which is shaped like a keyhole, having one square end and one circular end, when viewed from above. The rectangular anterior section is orientated to the northeast. The burial mound is constructed in three tiers. On the outer surface of the mound, fukiishi revetment stones (the size of a human head), fragments of haniwa clay figures, and iron artifacts (possibly fragments of armor) have been unearthed. A shield-shaped moat surrounds the mound (the only one of its kind among the tumuli around Ushimado Bay). The total length including the moat is approximately 100 meters.

The construction period is estimated to be the latter half of the 5th century, during the middle of the Kofun period. Around the same time as this tumulus, the Tsukiyama Kofun was also constructed in the Osafune area as a tumulus with a surrounding moat. This has led to speculation about a possible connection between the disappearance of large tumuli in the Kibi region and the turmoil in the Kibi region during the reign of Emperor Yūryaku, as described in the Nihon Shoki.

Total length
84 meters (100 with moat)
Anterior rectangular portion
64 meters wide x 7 meters high, 3-tier
Constriction
28 meters wide x 5 meters high, 3 tiers
Posterior circular portion
41 meter diameter x 7 meters high, 3-tiers

== Kashino Jinja ==
The Kashino Jinja is located south of the Kashinoyama Kofun. It enshrines five kami: Amenokoyane-no-Mikoto, Futsunushi-no-Mikoto, Takemikazuchi-no-Mikoto, Hime-no-Okami, and Yamadahiko-no-Mikoto. A ridge beam inscription from 1617 (Genna 3) indicates that the shrine was rebuilt during the Jingo-Keiun era (767-770). Initially, it was enshrined as Inazu Myōjin, later renamed Gosha Daimyōjin, and then renamed Kashino Jinja during the Meiji period. The Honden is designated as an Important Tangible Cultural Property of Setouchi City.

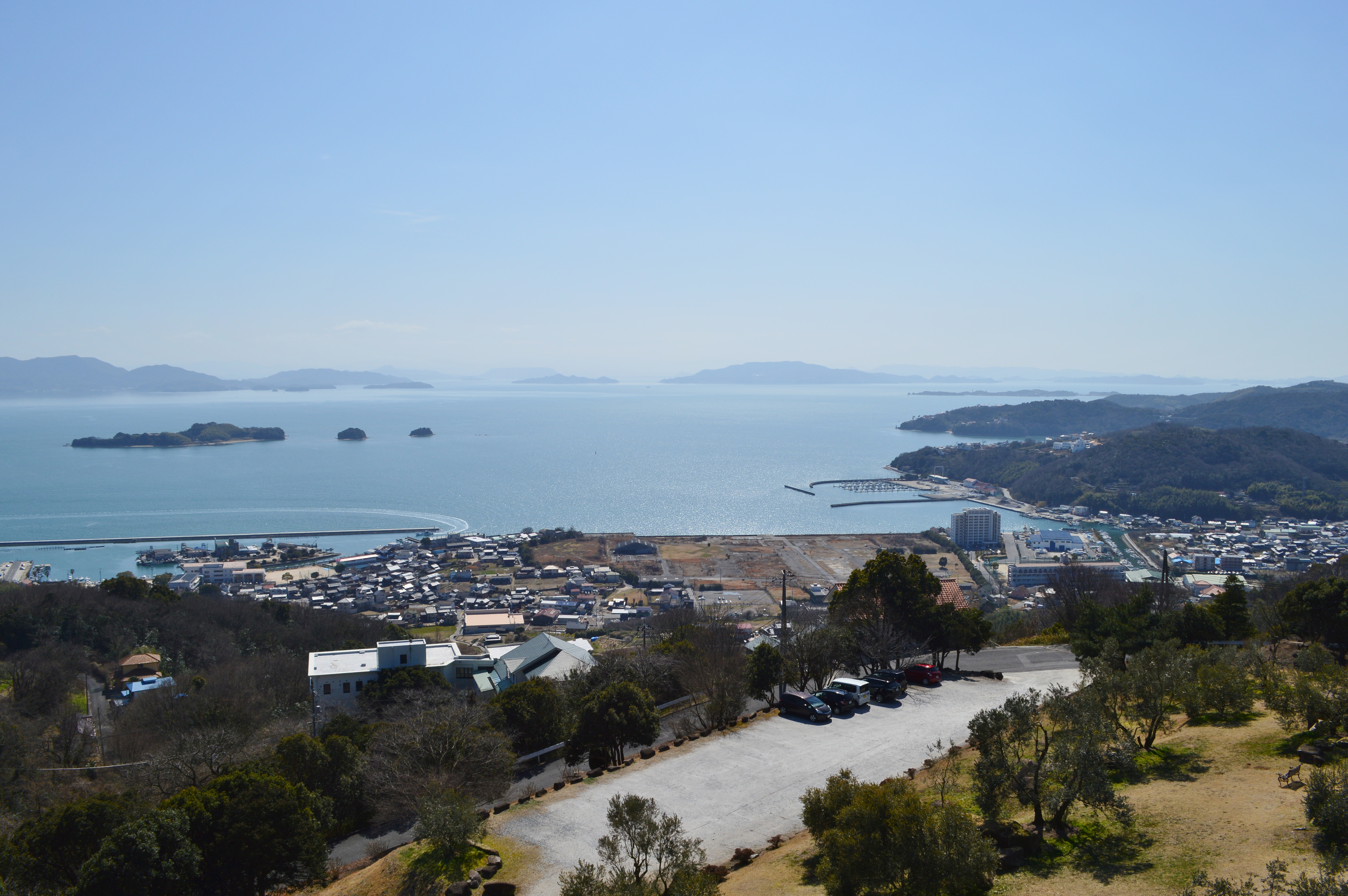
Ushimado Bay

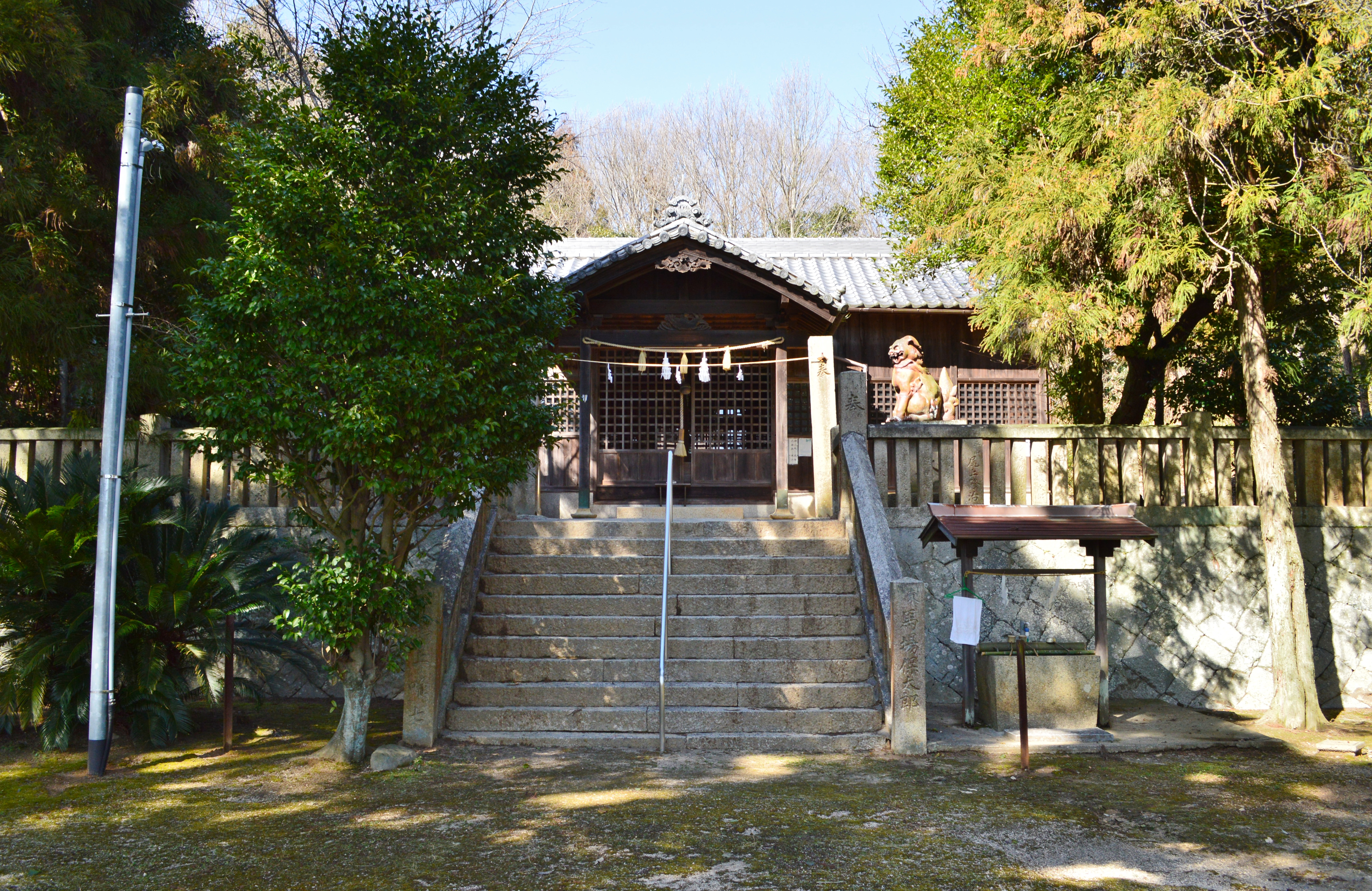
Kashino Jinja

The tumulus is approximately ten kilometers southeast of Oku Station on the JR West Ako Line.

== See also ==
- List of Historic Sites of Japan (Okayama)
