= Kagato Station =

Railway station in Bizen, Okayama Prefecture, Japan

Kagato Station 香登駅
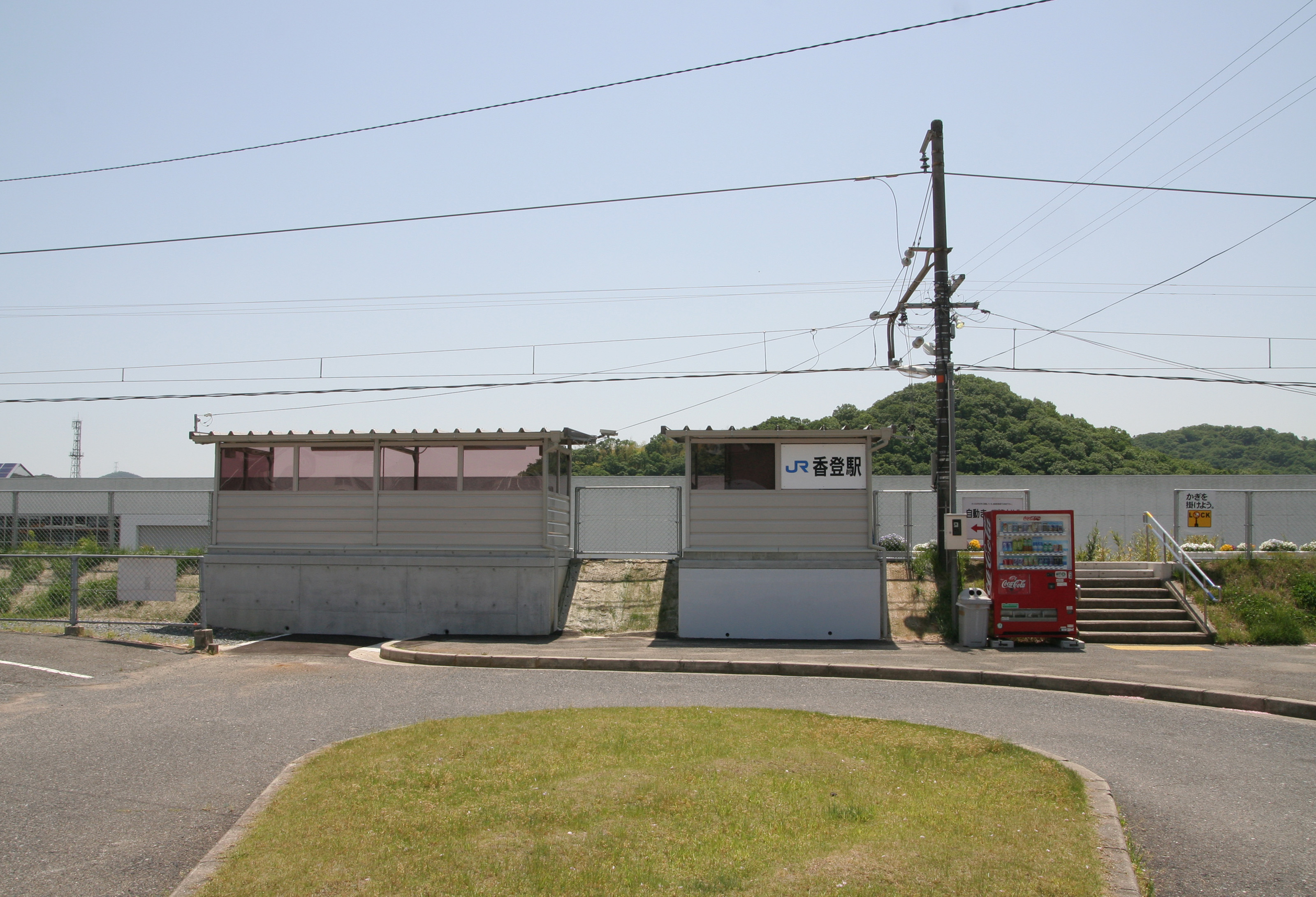
- Kagato Station in May 2008

General information
- Location: Kagato-nishi, Bizen-shi, Okayama-ken 705-0011; Japan
- Coordinates: 34°43′40.04″N 134°7′10.56″E
- Owner: West Japan Railway Company
- Operator: West Japan Railway Company
- Line: N Akō Line
- Distance: 38.5 km (23.9 miles) from Aioi
- Platforms: 1 side platform
- Tracks: 1
- Connections: Bus stop

Other information
- Status: Unstaffed
- Station code: JR-N10
- Website: Official website

History
- Opened: 1 September 1962

Passengers
- FY2019: 290 daily
Location
- Location within Okayama Prefecture Location within Japan

Kagato Station (香登駅, Kagato-eki) is a passenger railway station located in the city of Bizen, Okayama Prefecture, Japan, operated by the West Japan Railway Company (JR West).

== Lines ==
Kagato Station is served by the JR Akō Line, and is located 38.5 kilometers from the terminus of the line at Aioi and 28.0 kilometers from Banshū-Akō.

== Station layout ==
The station consists of one side platform serving single bi-directional track. There is no station building, and the station is unattended.

== Adjacent stations ==
«	Service	»
JR West Akō Line
Imbe	-	Osafune

== History ==
Kagato Station was opened on 1 September 1962. With the privatization of Japanese National Railways (JNR) on 1 April 1987, the station came under the control of JR West.

== Passenger statistics ==
In fiscal 2019, the station was used by an average of 290 passengers daily

== Surrounding area ==
- Japan National Route 2
- Bizen Osafune Sword Museum
- Tsuruyama Maruyama Kofun

== See also ==
- List of railway stations in Japan
