= Oku District, Okayama =

Former district in Okayama prefecture, Japan

Oku (邑久郡, Oku-gun) was a district located in Okayama Prefecture, Japan.

As of 2003, the district had an estimated population of 39,365 and a density of 313.64 persons per km^{2}. The total area was 125.51 km^{2}.

== Towns and villages ==
- Oku
- Osafune
- Ushimado

== Merger ==
- On November 1, 2004 - the towns of Oku, Osafune and Ushimado were merged to create the city of Setouchi.
