= Tsuruyama Maruyama Kofun =

Megalithic tomb in Bizen, Japan

- 鶴山丸山古墳 (Japanese)
- Tsuruyama Maruyama Kofun Tsuruyama Maruyama Kofun (Japan)
- Interactive map of Tsuruyama Maruyama Kofun
- 34°43′28″N 134°07′13″E
- Type: Kofun
- Periods: Kofun period
- Location: Bizen, Okayama Prefecture, Japan
- Region: San'yō region

History
- Built: c.4th century

Site notes
- Public access: Yes (no facilities)

Tsuruyama Maruyama Kofun (鶴山丸山古墳) is a Kofun period burial mound, located in the Hatakeda, neighborhood of the city of Bizen, Okayama Prefecture, in the San'yō region of Japan. The tumulus was designated a National Historic Site of Japan in 1957.

== Overview ==
The Tsuruyama Maruyama Kofun is an enpun (円墳) circular kofun. In 1936, the stone burial chamber was discovered by local residents in the Tsuruyama Hills, 500 meters south of JR West Akō Line Kagato Station. The tumulus is oblong, and measures 45 meters from east-to-west and 54 meters from north-to-south. Fukiishi and a row of cylindrical haniwa can be seen on the surface of the mound, and on the southeastern side is a 15-meter-wide extension.

Subsequent archaeological excavations by Kyoto University confirmed that the pit-type stone chamber was about 4 meters long and 1.5 meters wide, and had a ceiling made of four processed tuff stones. Some of the ceiling stones have projections and round holes for a rope used to raise and lower the sarcophagus. Inside the burial chamber was a house-shaped sarcophagus, also made from white tuff from what is now eastern Kagawa Prefecture. The sarcophagus is carved with patterns including that of the sun. Inside were large quantity of grave goods, including more than 30 bronze mirrors, bronze bells, four-legged jade boards, crucible stands, iron swords and arrowheads, and giant magatama beads. From these items and the structure of the tumulus, it is estimated to have been built in the latter half of the 4th century in the early Kofun period.

The excavated items are stored in the Tokyo National Museum, although the whereabouts of many of the excavated items, including 13 of the bronze mirrors is currently unknown. Fifteen of the surviving excavated artifacts were collectively designated a National Tangible Cultural Property in 2019.

== See also ==
- List of Historic Sites of Japan (Okayama)
