= Oku, Okayama =

Dissolved municipality in Okayama prefecture, Japan

Oku (邑久町, Oku-chō) was a town located in Oku District, Okayama Prefecture, Japan.

== Population ==
As of 2003, the town had an estimated population of 19,389 and a density of 282.19 persons per km^{2}. The total area was 68.71 km^{2}.

== Merge ==
On November 1, 2004, Oku, along with the towns of Osafune and Ushimado (all from Oku District), was merged to create the city of Setouchi.
