= Ushimado, Okayama =

Dissolved municipality in Okayama prefecture, Japan

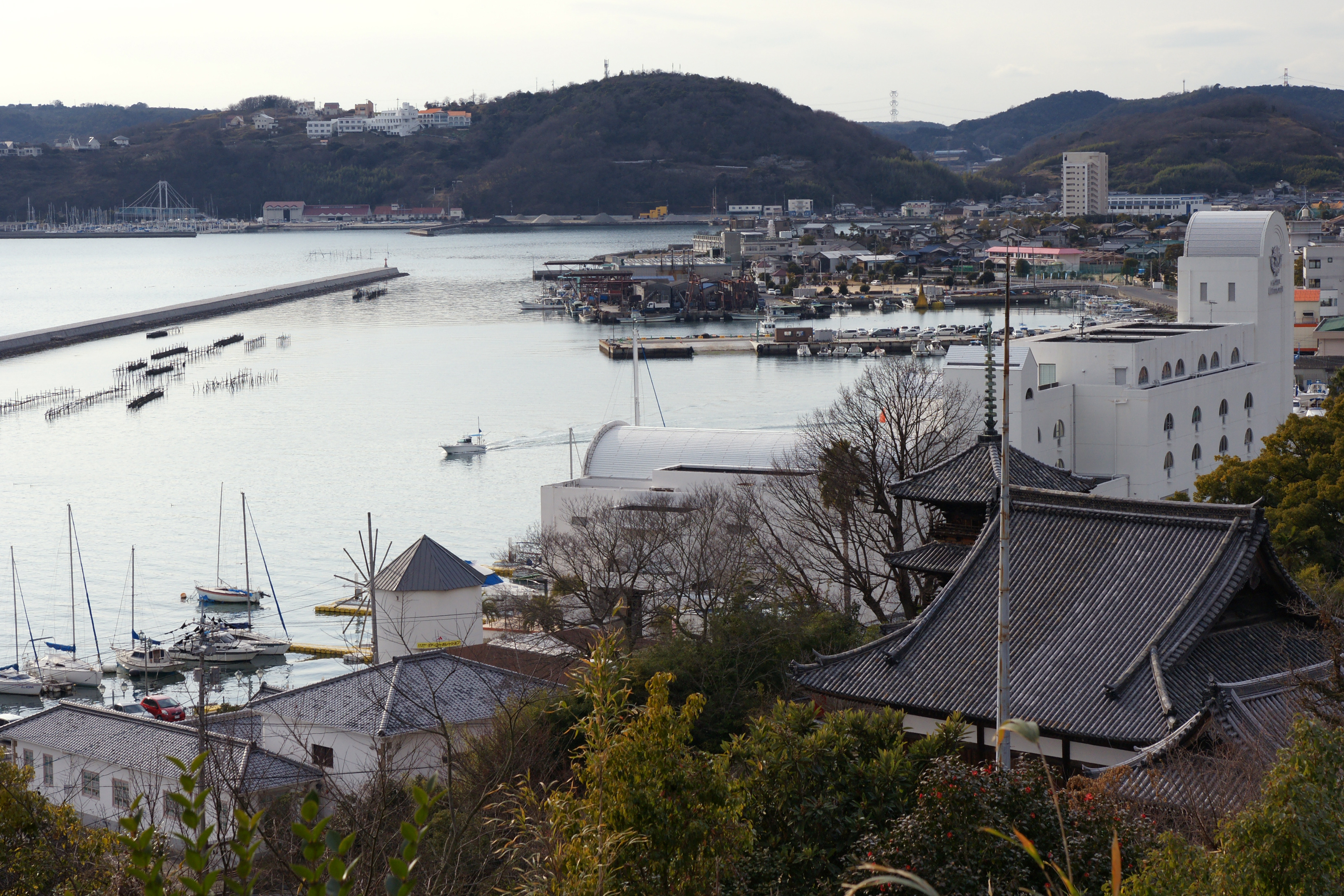
Ushimado Port

Ushimado (牛窓町, Ushimado-chō) was a town located in Oku District, Okayama Prefecture, Japan.

== Overview ==
It faces Okayama City to the west, Ōku town to the north, and the Seto Inland Sea to the east and south. In particular, it is focused on tourism, and is called the "Aegean Sea of Japan". It is also one of Okayama Prefecture's leading mushroom producers and one of Japan's two largest olive producing areas, as well as Shodoshima, Kagawa Prefecture.

== History ==
As of 2003, the town had an estimated population of 7,545 and a density of 274.36 persons per km^{2}. The total area was 27.50 km^{2}.

On November 1, 2004, Ushimado, along with the towns of Oku and Osafune (all from Oku District), was merged to create the city of Setouchi.
