= Oku Station (Okayama) =

Railway station in Setouchi, Okayama Prefecture, Japan

Oku Station 邑久駅
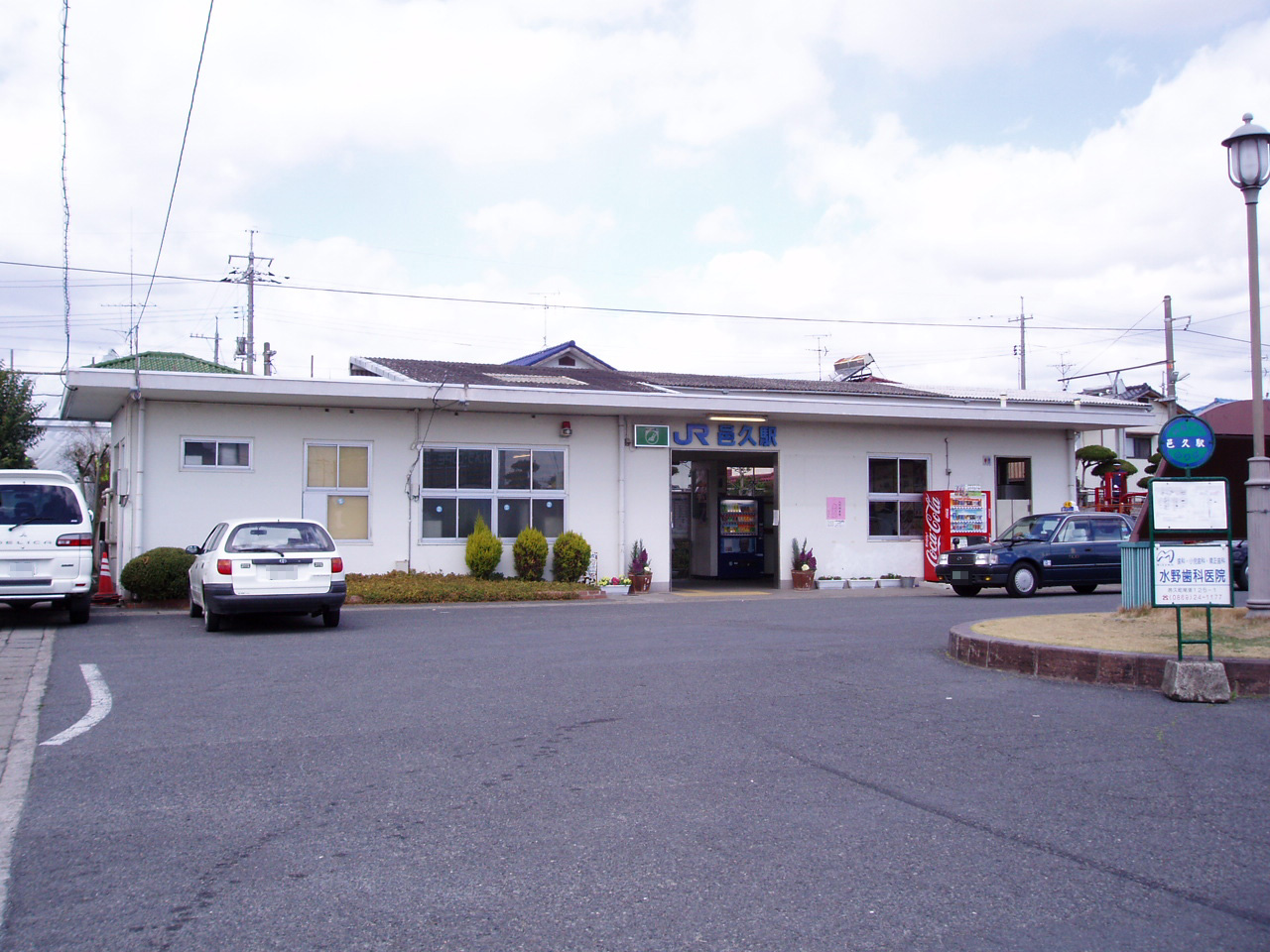
- Oku Station in March 2018

General information
- Location: Oku-cho Yamadanosho, Setouchi-shi, Okayama-ken 701-4246; Japan
- Coordinates: 34°40′6.7″N 134°5′28.20″E
- Owner: West Japan Railway Company
- Operator: West Japan Railway Company
- Line: N Akō Line
- Distance: 45.9 km (28.5 miles) from Aioi
- Platforms: 1 side platform
- Tracks: 1
- Connections: Bus stop

Other information
- Status: Unstaffed
- Station code: JR-N08
- Website: Official website

History
- Opened: 1 September 1962

Passengers
- FY2019: 1840 daily
Location
- Location within Okayama Prefecture Location within Japan

Oku Station (邑久駅, Oku-eki) is a passenger railway station located in the city of Setouchi, Okayama Prefecture, Japan, operated by the West Japan Railway Company (JR West).

== Lines ==
Oku Station is served by the JR Akō Line, and is located 45.9 kilometers from the terminus of the line at Aioi and 35.4 kilometers from Banshū-Akō.

== Station layout ==
The station consists of one side platform serving single bi-directional track. There is a slope from the ticket gate to the platform, and it is wheelchair accessible. The station is unattended.

== Adjacent stations ==
«	Service	»
JR West Akō Line
Osafune	-	Ōdomi

== History ==
Oku Station was opened on 1 September 1962. With the privatization of Japanese National Railways (JNR) on 1 April 1987, the station came under the control of JR West.

== Passenger statistics ==
In fiscal 2019, the station was used by an average of 1840 passengers daily

== Surrounding area ==
- Setouchi City Hall
- Setouchi Municipal Setouchi Municipal Hospital
- Okayama Prefectural Oku High School
- Setouchi Municipal Oku Elementary School

== See also ==
- List of railway stations in Japan
