= Osafune, Okayama =

Dissolved municipality in Okayama prefecture, Japan

Osafune (長船町, Osafune-chō) was a town located in Oku District, Okayama Prefecture, Japan.

As of 2003, the town had an estimated population of 12,431 and a density of 424.27 persons per km^{2}. The total area was 29.30 km^{2}.

On November 1, 2004, Osafune, along with the towns of Oku and Ushimado (all from Oku District), was merged to create the city of Setouchi.
