= Osafune Station =

Railway station in Setouchi, Okayama Prefecture, Japan

Osafune Station 長船駅
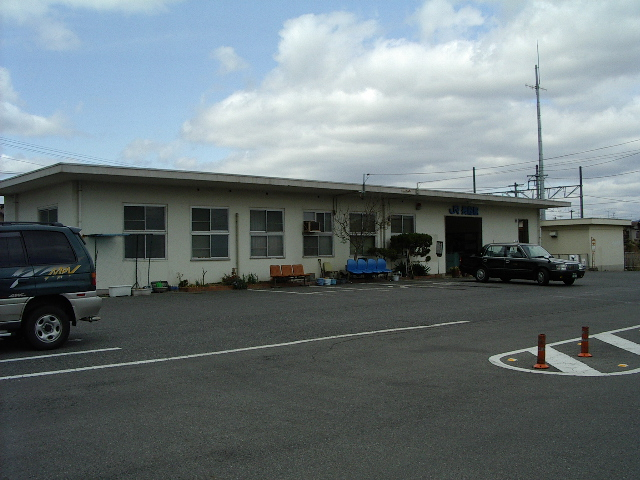
- Osafune Station in 2007

General information
- Location: 440-1 Osafune-cho Fukuoka, Setouchi-shi, Okayama-ken 701-4265; Japan
- Coordinates: 34°41′59.47″N 134°5′56.3″E
- Owner: West Japan Railway Company
- Operator: West Japan Railway Company
- Line: N Akō Line
- Distance: 42.3 km (26.3 miles) from Aioi
- Platforms: 2 side platforms
- Tracks: 2
- Connections: Bus stop

Other information
- Status: Unstaffed
- Station code: JR-N09
- Website: Official website

History
- Opened: 1 September 1962

Passengers
- FY2019: 1153 daily
Location
- Location within Okayama Prefecture Location within Japan

Osafune Station (長船駅, Osafune-eki) is a passenger railway station located in the city of Setouchi, Okayama Prefecture, Japan, operated by the West Japan Railway Company (JR West).

== Lines ==
Osafune Station is served by the JR Akō Line, and is located 42.3 kilometers from the terminus of the line at Aioi and 31.8 kilometers from Banshū-Akō.

== Station layout ==
The station consists of two ground-level opposed side platforms connected by a footbridge. The station is unattended.

=== Platforms ===
1	■ N Akō Line	for Saidaiji and Okayama
2	■ N Akō Line	for Banshū-Akō and Aioi

== Adjacent stations ==
«	Service	»
JR West Akō Line
Kagato	-	Oku

== History ==
Osafune Station was opened on 1 September 1962. With the privatization of Japanese National Railways (JNR) on 1 April 1987, the station came under the control of JR West.

== Passenger statistics ==
In fiscal 2019, the station was used by an average of 1153 passengers daily

== Surrounding area ==
- Setouchi City Hall Osafune Branch (Former Osafune Town Office)
- Okayama Prefectural Road 69 Saidaiji Bizen Line

== See also ==
- List of railway stations in Japan
