= Setouchi, Okayama =

Setouchi 瀬戸内市
- City
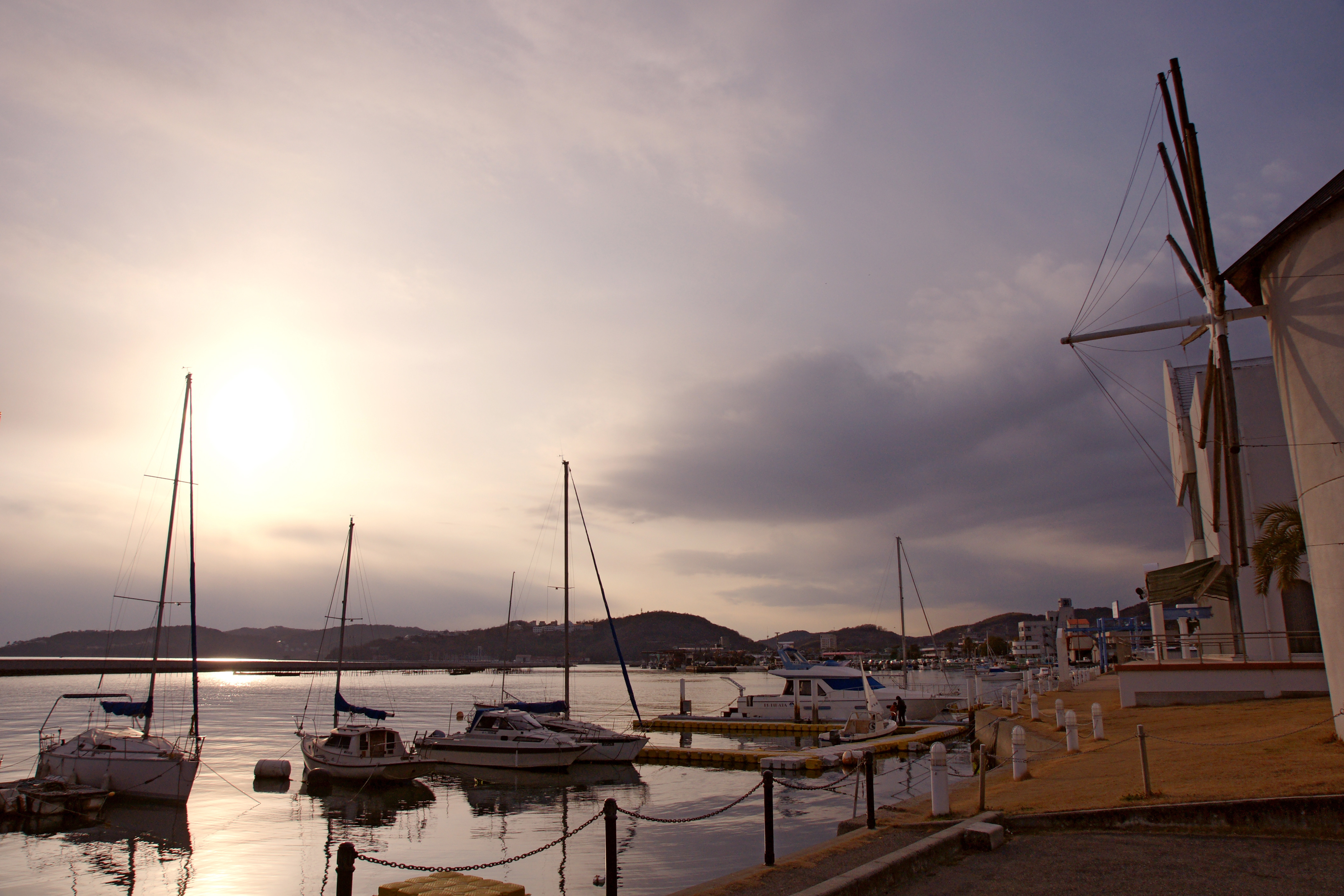
- Ushimado Port and resort area

- Flag Seal
- Location of Setouchi in Okayama Prefecture

- Location in Japan
- Coordinates: 34°40′N 134°6′E
- Country: Japan
- Region: Chūgoku (San'yō)
- Prefecture: Okayama

Government
  - Mayor: Kentaro Kuroishi (since June 2025)

Area
  - Total: 125.45 km^{2} (48.44 sq mi)

Population (February 1, 2023)
  - Total: 36,499
  - Density: 290.94/km^{2} (753.54/sq mi)
- Time zone: UTC+09:00 (JST)
- City hall address: 300-1 Oku-cho Owari, Setouchi-shi, Okayama-ken 701-4292
- Climate: Cfa
- Website: Official website
- Symbols
- Bird: Japanese white-eye
- Flower: Chrysanthemum
- Tree: Olive

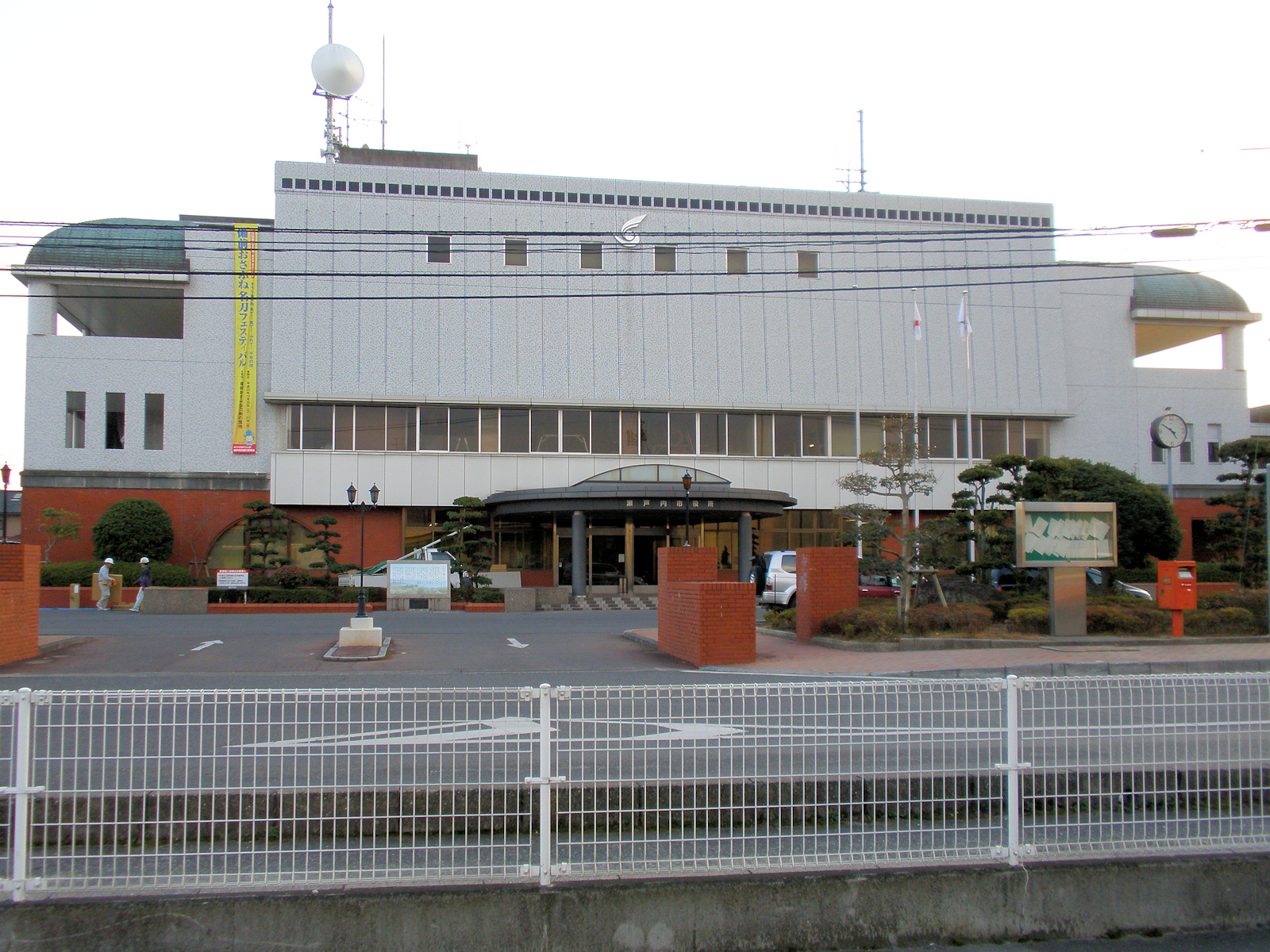
Setouchi City Hall

Setouchi (瀬戸内市, Setouchi-shi) is a city located in southern Okayama Prefecture, Japan. As of 31 January 2023, the city had an estimated population of 36,499 in 15,934 households and a population density of 290 persons per km². The total area of the city is 125.45 square kilometres (48.44 sq mi).

== Geography ==
Setouchi is located in southeastern Okayama Prefecture(called the Tobi region) to the east of the prefectural capital of Okayama city. It faces the Seto Inland Sea to the south, and the coastline is intricate and forms part of the Setonaikai National Park. Inhabited islands such as Nagashima and the Ushimado Islands are within the city limits.The western part forms part of the Okayama Plain across the Yoshii River and is called the Sencho Plain. Most of the area is mountain forest at an elevation of 100 to 300 meters.

=== Adjoining municipalities ===
Okayama Prefecture

- Bizen
- Higashi-ku, Okayama

=== Climate ===
Setouchi has a humid subtropical climate (Köppen climate classification Cfa). The average annual temperature in Setouchi is 15.1 °C (59.2 °F). The average annual rainfall is 1,150.6 mm (45.30 in) with July as the wettest month. The temperatures are highest on average in August, at around 27.3 °C (81.1 °F), and lowest in January, at around 4.2 °C (39.6 °F). The highest temperature ever recorded in Setouchi was 37.4 °C (99.3 °F) on 30 July 2004; the coldest temperature ever recorded was −7.6 °C (18.3 °F) on 27 February 1981.

Climate data for Mushiage, Setouchi (1991−2020 normals, extremes 1979−present)
Month	Jan	Feb	Mar	Apr	May	Jun	Jul	Aug	Sep	Oct	Nov	Dec	Year
Record high °C (°F)	17.4 (63.3)	22.0 (71.6)	23.5 (74.3)	27.8 (82.0)	30.8 (87.4)	34.7 (94.5)	37.4 (99.3)	37.3 (99.1)	36.1 (97.0)	32.1 (89.8)	24.8 (76.6)	20.9 (69.6)	37.4 (99.3)
Mean daily maximum °C (°F)	9.4 (48.9)	9.9 (49.8)	13.2 (55.8)	18.5 (65.3)	23.2 (73.8)	26.3 (79.3)	30.2 (86.4)	32.0 (89.6)	28.3 (82.9)	22.8 (73.0)	17.2 (63.0)	11.8 (53.2)	20.2 (68.4)
Daily mean °C (°F)	4.2 (39.6)	4.5 (40.1)	7.7 (45.9)	12.8 (55.0)	17.8 (64.0)	21.9 (71.4)	25.9 (78.6)	27.3 (81.1)	23.5 (74.3)	17.6 (63.7)	11.7 (53.1)	6.5 (43.7)	15.1 (59.2)
Mean daily minimum °C (°F)	−0.7 (30.7)	−0.6 (30.9)	2.0 (35.6)	7.0 (44.6)	12.4 (54.3)	17.8 (64.0)	22.5 (72.5)	23.7 (74.7)	19.4 (66.9)	12.8 (55.0)	6.7 (44.1)	1.6 (34.9)	10.4 (50.7)
Record low °C (°F)	−6.9 (19.6)	−7.6 (18.3)	−4.6 (23.7)	−2.4 (27.7)	2.3 (36.1)	8.8 (47.8)	14.9 (58.8)	15.8 (60.4)	7.7 (45.9)	2.9 (37.2)	−2.3 (27.9)	−4.6 (23.7)	−7.6 (18.3)
Average precipitation mm (inches)	36.1 (1.42)	43.8 (1.72)	83.8 (3.30)	88.3 (3.48)	116.2 (4.57)	154.2 (6.07)	172.8 (6.80)	98.8 (3.89)	162.6 (6.40)	98.0 (3.86)	53.6 (2.11)	43.1 (1.70)	1,150.6 (45.30)
Average precipitation days (≥ 1.0 mm)	5.0	6.4	8.8	9.0	9.1	11.0	10.2	6.6	8.6	7.4	5.8	5.3	93.2
Mean monthly sunshine hours	149.6	143.3	177.4	197.5	207.9	159.0	186.4	228.0	159.3	149.9	146.6	158.6	2,059.8
Source: Japan Meteorological Agency

=== Demographics ===
Per Japanese census data, the population of Setouchi in 2020 is 36,048 people. Setouchi has been conducting censuses since 1950.

Historical population
Year	Pop.	±%
1950	41,449	—
1955	40,619	−2.0%
1960	38,789	−4.5%
1965	35,814	−7.7%
1970	33,769	−5.7%
1975	35,866	+6.2%
1980	37,939	+5.8%
1985	38,838	+2.4%
1990	38,928	+0.2%
1995	39,228	+0.8%
2000	39,403	+0.4%
2005	39,081	−0.8%
2010	37,858	−3.1%
2015	36,975	−2.3%
2020	36,048	−2.5%
Setouchi population statistics

== History ==
The area Setouchi was part of ancient Bizen Province. Port Ushimado was a famous port till the early modern era. It served messengers from Korea to the Imperial Court and later to the Tokugawa shogunate. The port is today a good spot for sightseeing and sailing. Osafune was famous for the production of katana in the 12th century under the name of Bizen Osafune. Fukuoka District, which flourished as a trade center and later a political center along the Seto Inland Sea until the beginning of the Edo period, served by the Yoshii River and the Seto Inland Sea, is also included as a part of the city. The Fukuoka Market (Fukuoka no Ichi) was recorded in the scroll Ippen Shonin Emaki, drawn in the 13th century. At the end of the Kamakura period a castle was built in Fukuoka. In the middle Muromachi period, the daimyō who governed Bizen province took this castle as their site, rebuilt and fortified it more than before. Because the Yoshii River changed its course and most of Fukuoka including the castle sank under the river, the castle was abandoned. During the Edo Period, the area was part of the holdings of Okayama Domain. After the Meiji restoration, the area was organized into villages, including the village of Oku within Oku District, Okayama on June 1, 1889 with the creation of the modern municipalities system. Oku was raised to town status on April 1, 1952 after merging with five neighboring villages. The city of Setouchi was founded on November 1, 2004, by the merger of Oku with the towns of Osafune and Ushimado (all from Oku District). Its city hall is the former town hall of Oku.

== Government ==
Setouchi has a mayor-council form of government with a directly elected mayor and a unicameral city council of 18 members. Setouchi contributes one member to the Okayama Prefectural Assembly. In terms of national politics, the city is part of the Okayama 2nd district of the lower house of the Diet of Japan.

== Economy ==
Setouchi has a mixed economy, based on agriculture, (rice, pumpkins, cabbage, mushrooms, olives), commercial fishing (aquaculture of oysters) and industry. Historically, the area was noted for its production of sea salt and production of Japanese swords.

== Education ==
Setouchi has nine public elementary schools and three public junior high schools, and one public high school operated by the Okayama prefectural Board of Education.

== Transportation ==
=== Railway ===
JR West (JR West) - Akō Line

- Osafune - Oku - Ōdomi

=== Highways ===
- National Route 2
- National Route 250

== Sister cities ==
- Mytilene, Greece (1982)
- Horokanai, Hokkaidō, Japan (1989)
- Tsushima, Nagasaki, Japan (1996)

== Local attractions ==
- Bizen Osafune Japanese sword Museum
- Honren-ji, National Historic Site
- Kadota Shell Mound, National Historic Site
- Yumeji Art Museum

== Noted people from Setouchi ==
- Yōichi Amano, manga artist
- Yumeji Takehisa, artist
