= Honkō-ji =

Buddhist temple in Aichi Prefecture, Japan

- 本光寺
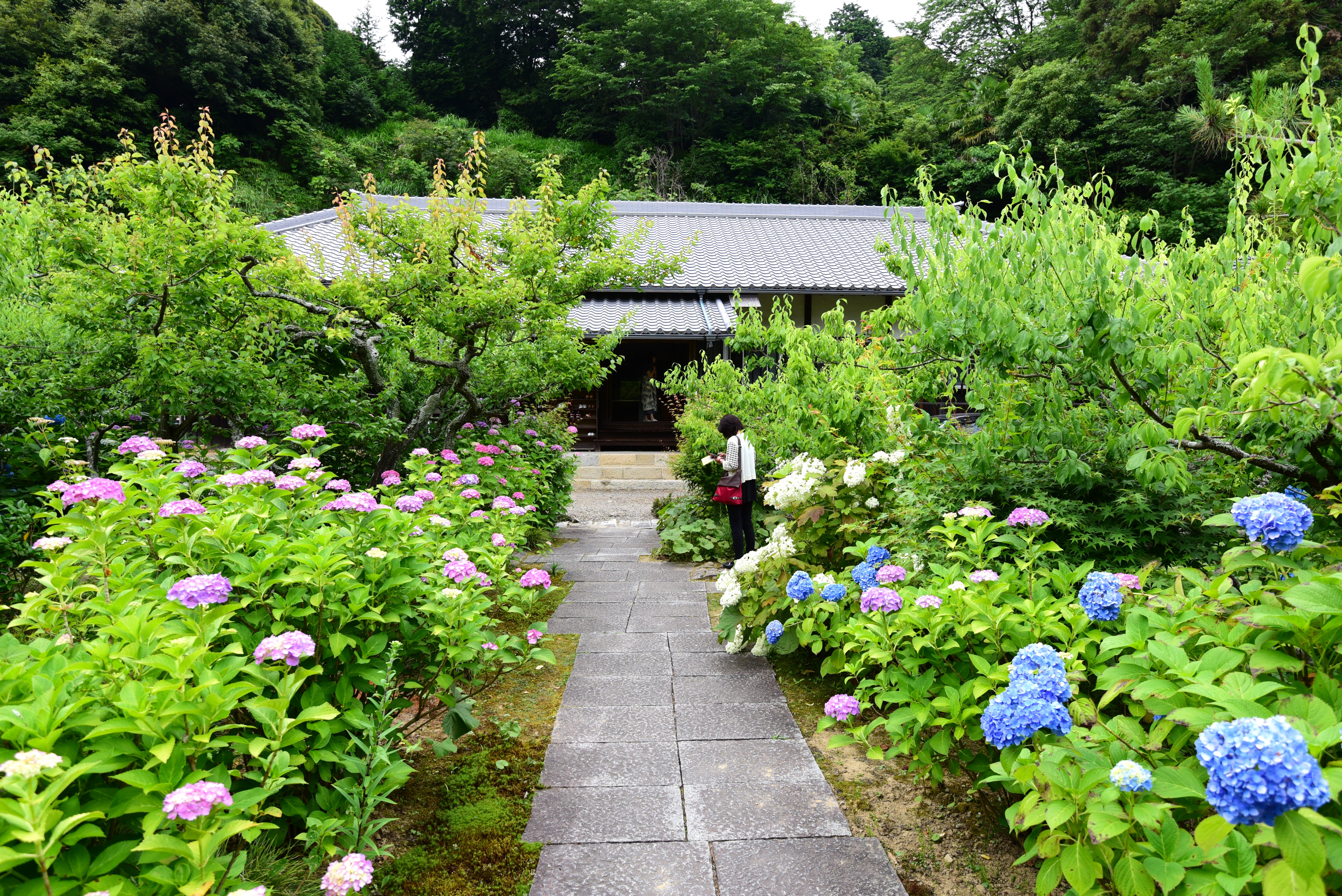
- Honkō-ji

- Honkō-ji Honkō-ji (Japan)

Religion
- Affiliation: Buddhism
- Deity: Shaka Nyōrai
- Rite: Sōtō school of Zen

Location
- Location: Uchiyama-17 Fukōzu, Kōta-machi, Nukata-gun, Aichi-ken 444-0124
- Country: Japan
- Interactive map of Honkō-ji
- Coordinates: 35°11′05″N 136°53′58″E

Architecture
- Founder: Matsudaira Tadasada
- Completed: 1573

Honkō-ji (本光寺) is a Buddhist temple belonging to the Sōtō sect of Japanese Zen located in the town of Kōta, Nukata District, Aichi Prefecture, Japan. The temple is noted for its hydrangea flowers in spring. Its main image is a statue of Shaka Nyōrai.

== History ==
Honkō-ji was founded in 1573 by Matsudaira Tadasada, the founder of the Fukōzu-Matsudaira clan, and served as the bodaiji of the clan throughout the Edo period, even after the clan's transfer to Shimabara Domain in Kyushu in 1668. The temple claims without evidence that its statue of Shaka Nyōrai and the flanking statues of Jizo Bosatsu and Senju Kannon are works of the famed Kamakura period sculptor Unkei.

== Fukōzu-Matsudaira Clan Cemetery ==
Honkō-ji's cemetery contains the graves of the chieftains of the Fukōzu-Matsudaira clan and was designated as a National Historic Site in 2014.

The graveyard is divided into east and west sections. The western section has the graves of the first five generations and the 11th generation chieftains. The mortuary chapel of the 5th generation chieftain, Matsudaira Tadatoshi (1582-1632) is called the Shōkei-dō (肖影堂), and survives to the present day. The eastern section contains the graves of the 6th through 10th and 12th through 19th generation chieftains. In August 2008, during the heavy rain, the tombstone of the 7th generation Matsudaira Tadao (1673-1736) collapsed, and when restoration were carried out and number of grave goods were recovered, including a tachi Japanese sword and some glass objects, including a Bohemian crystal cup dated around 1599.

== Gallery ==
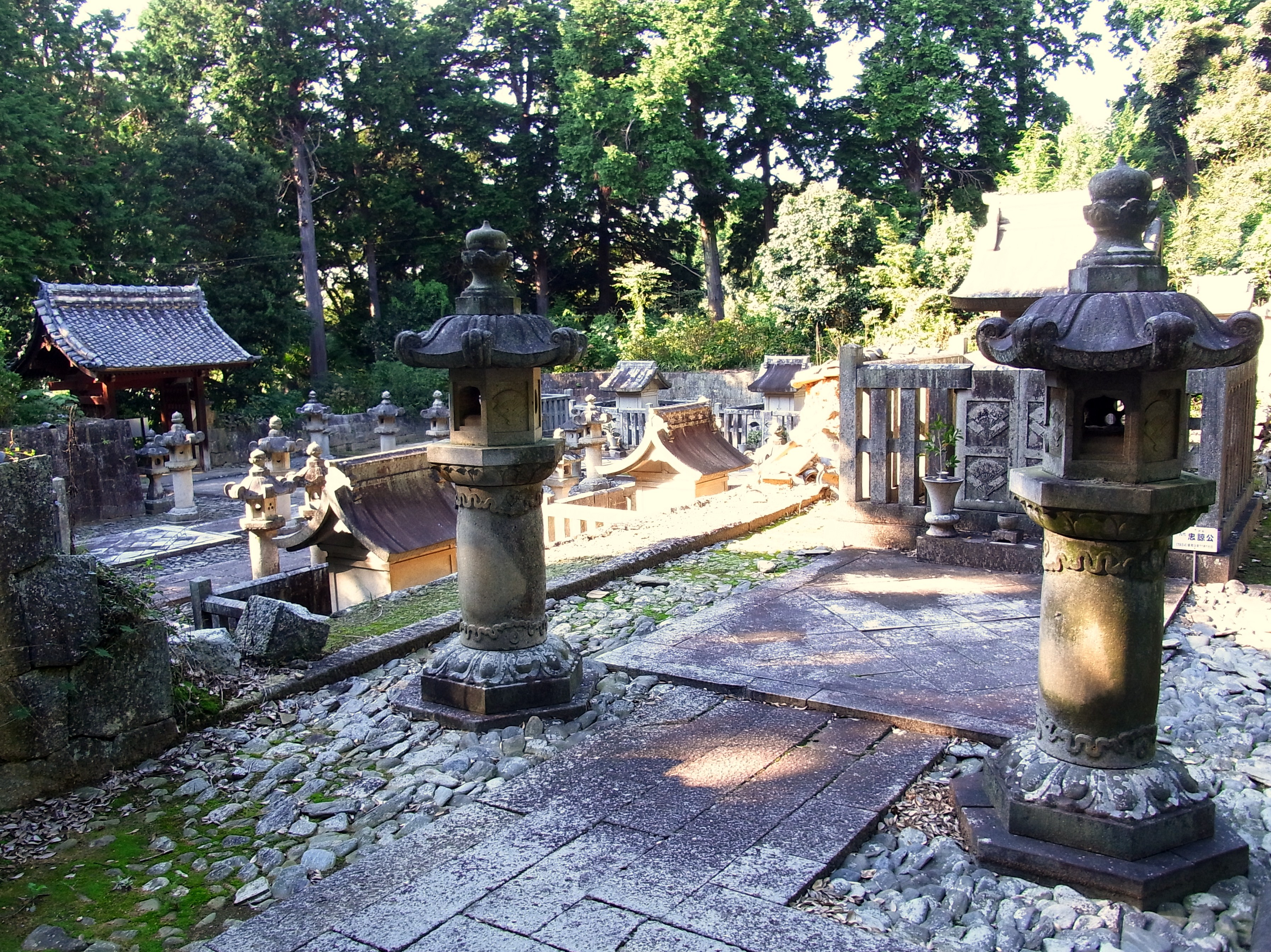
East Cemetery

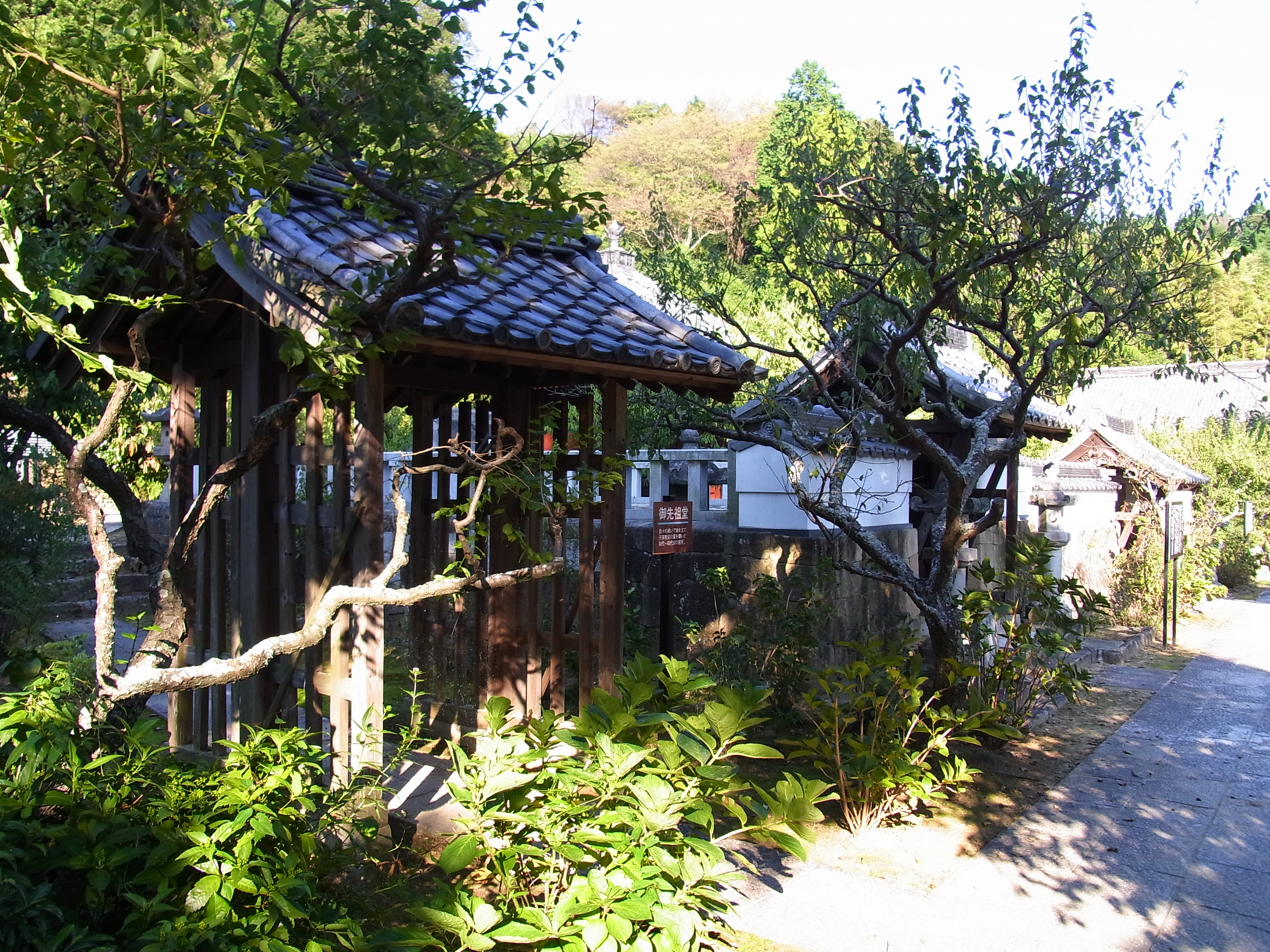
West Cemetery

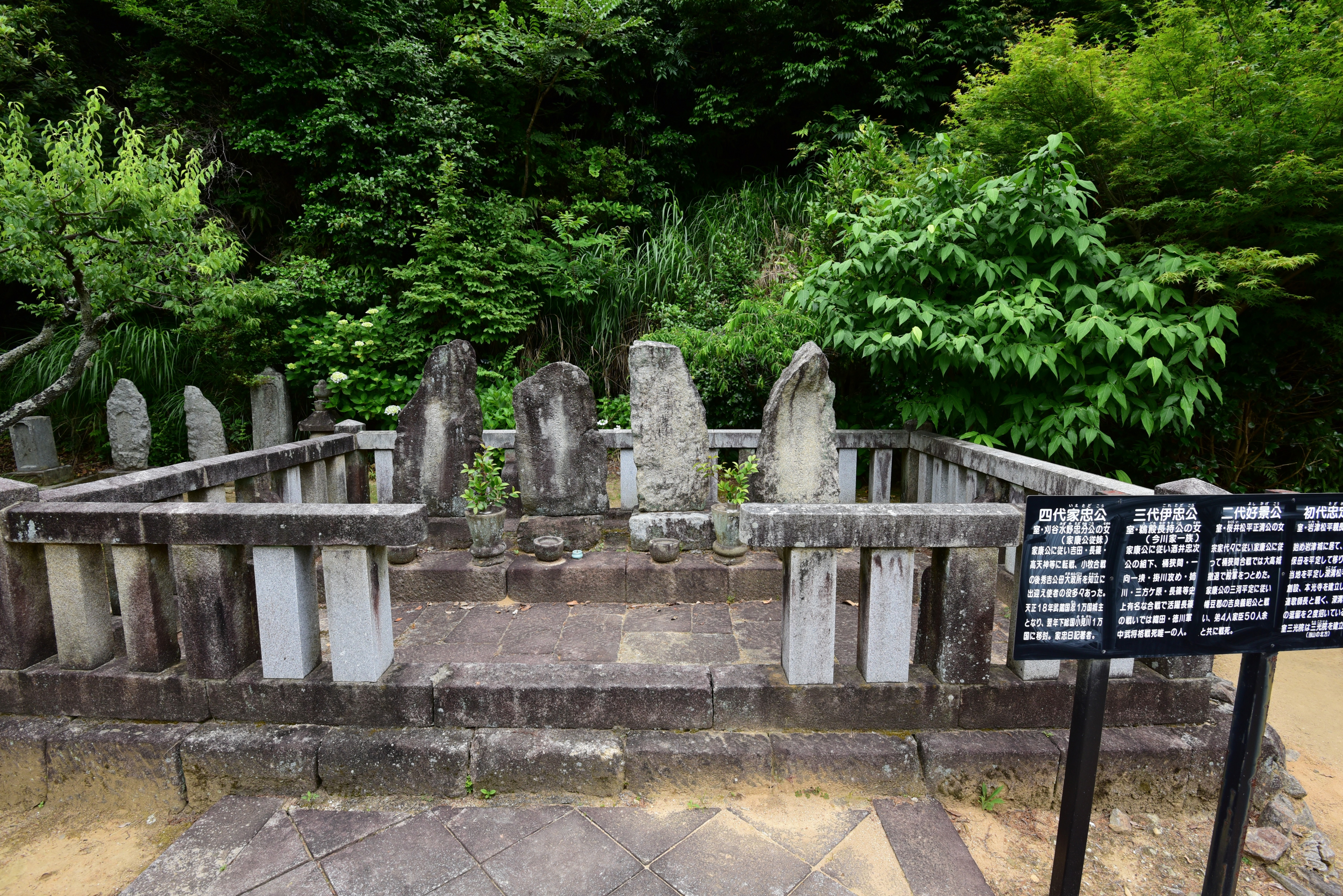
graves of first 3 generations of Fukōzu-Matsudaira

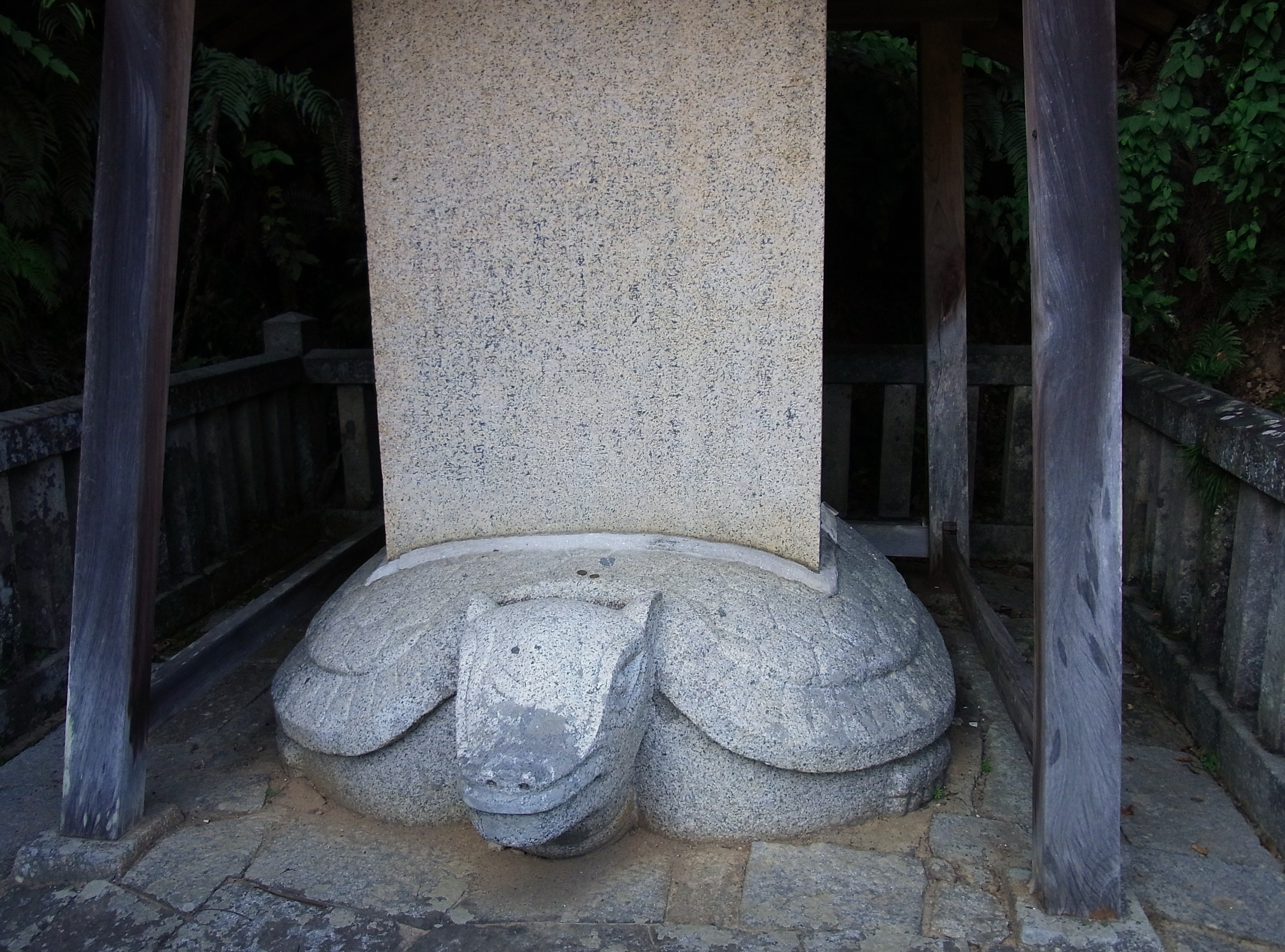
Grave of Matsudaira Tadahiro

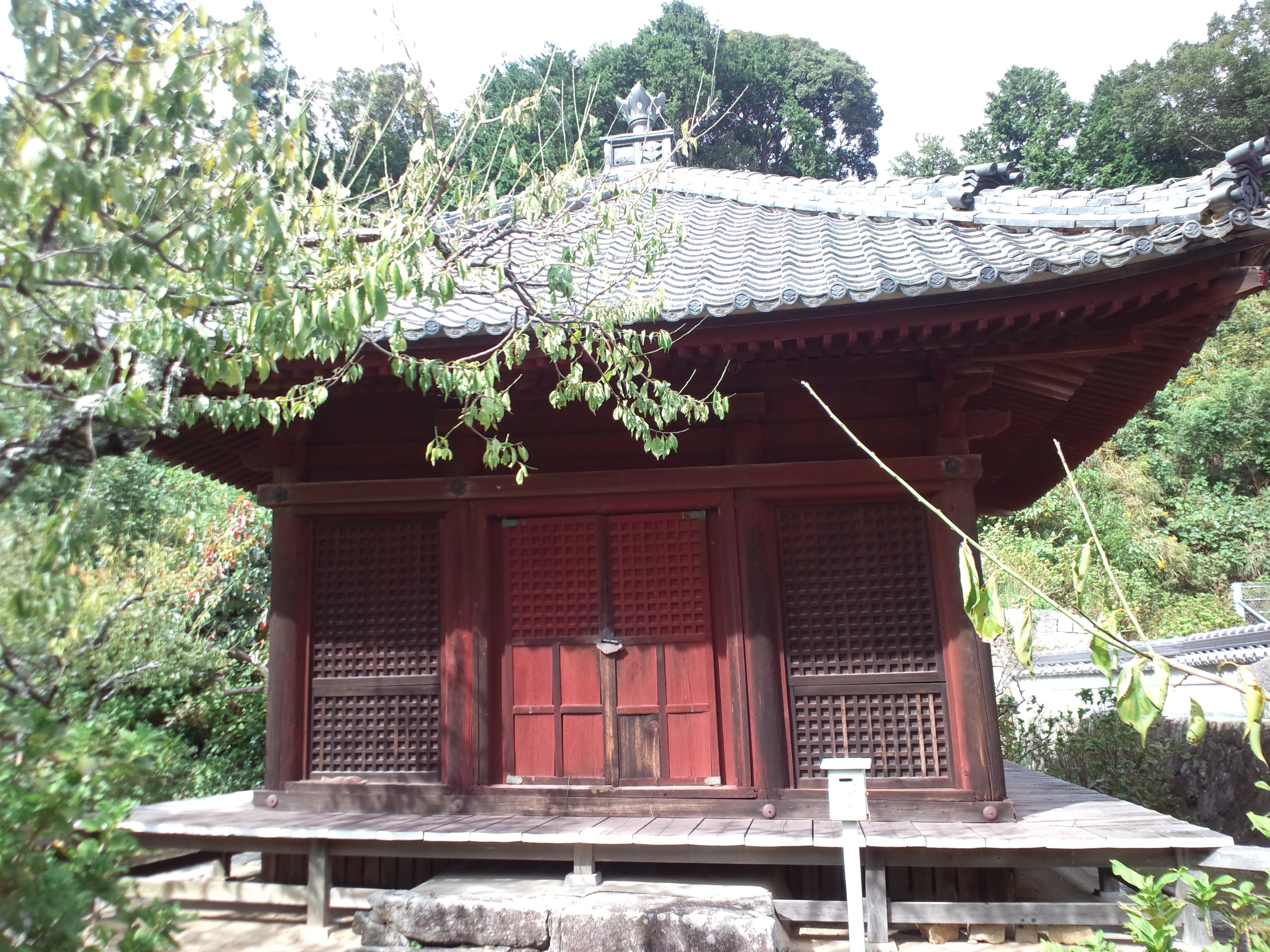
Mortuary chapel of 5th generation Matsudaira Tadatoshi

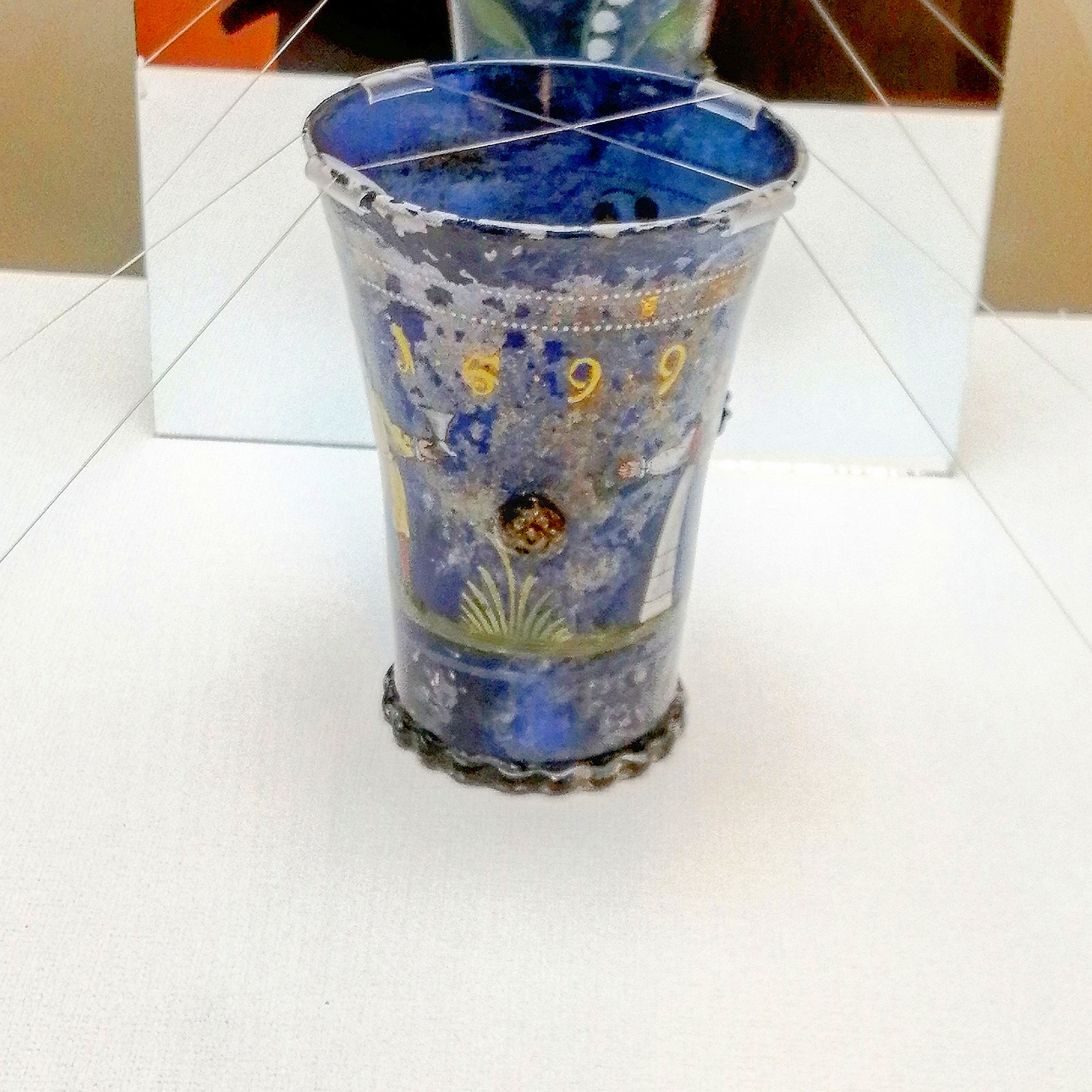
Bohemian crystal cup

== See also ==
- List of Historic Sites of Japan (Aichi)
